This is a complete list of all 2071 Statutory Instruments published in the United Kingdom in the year 1996.

1-100
 Insurance Companies (Pension Business)(Transitional Provisions) (Amendment) Regulations 1996 S.I. 1996/1
 Sea Fishing (Enforcement of Community Control Measures) (Amendment) Order 1996 S.I. 1996/2
 Occupational Pension Schemes (Deficiency on Winding Up etc.) Amendment Regulations 1996 S.I. 1996/5
 National Disability Council Regulations 1996 S.I. 1996/11
 Weymouth Harbour Revision Order 1996 S.I. 1996/15
 Road Vehicles (Construction and Use) (Amendment) Regulations 1996 S.I. 1996/16
 Friendly Societies (Gilt-edged Securities) (Periodic Accounting for Tax on Interest) Regulations 1996 S.I. 1996/21
 Civil Aviation (Canadian Navigation Services) (Third Amendment) Regulations 1996 S.I. 1996/22
 Town and Country Planning (Costs of Inquiries etc.) (Standard Daily Amount) Regulations 1996 S.I. 1996/24
 Plant Health (Great Britain) (Amendment) Order 1996 S.I. 1996/25
 Plant Health (Licence Fees) (England and Wales) Regulations 1996 S.I. 1996/26
 Hill Livestock (Compensatory Allowances) (Amendment) Regulations 1996 S.I. 1996/27
 Sheep and Goats (Records, Identification and Movement) Order 1996 S.I. 1996/28
 Food Protection (Emergency Prohibitions) (Radioactivity in Sheep) (Wales) (Partial Revocation) Order 1996 S.I. 1996/29
 Social Security (Persons From Abroad) Miscellaneous Amendments Regulations 1996 S.I. 1996/30
 Food Protection (Emergency Prohibitions) (Radioactivity in Sheep) Partial Revocation Order 1996 S.I. 1996/31
 Prisons and Young Offenders Institutions (Scotland) Amendment Rules 1996 S.I. 1996/32
 National Blood Authority (Transfer of Trust Property) Order 1996 S.I. 1996/33
 National Blood Authority (Transfer of Trust Property) (No. 2) Order 1996 S.I. 1996/34
 King's Mill Centre for Health Care Services National Health Service Trust (Transfer of Trust Property) Order 1996 S.I. 1996/35
 A41 Trunk Road (Barnet) Red Route (No. 1)Experimental Traffic Order 1996 S.I. 1996/41
 A41 Trunk Road (Barnet) Red Route (No. 2) Experimental Traffic Order 1996 S.I. 1996/42
 Local Government Changes for England (Valuation and Community Charge Tribunals) Regulations 1996 S.I. 1996/43
 Sheep Annual Premium and Suckler Cow Premium Quotas (Re-assessment of Eligibility) Regulations 1996 S.I. 1996/48
 Sheep Annual Premium (Amendment) Regulations 1996 S.I. 1996/49
 Judicial Pensions (Additional Voluntary Contributions) (Amendment) Regulations 1996 S.I. 1996/52
 Kent County Council (Wainscott Northern Bypass) Motorway Scheme 1992 Confirmation Instrument 1996 S.I. 1996/53
 Taxes (Interest Rate) (Amendment)Regulations 1996 S.I. 1996/54
 Local Government Reorganisation (Wales) (Council Tax Reduction Scheme) Order 1996 S.I. 1996/56
 Upper Spey and Associated Waters Protection (Renewal) Order 1993 Variation Order 1996 S.I. 1996/57
 River Tay Catchment Area Protection (Renewal) Order 1993 Variation Order 1996 S.I. 1996/58
 East of Abercynon—East of Dowlais Trunk Road (A4060) (Improvement of Mountain Hare to Dowlais Top) Order 1996 S.I. 1996/60
 River Teign Mussel Fishery (Variation) (Oysters) Order 1996 S.I. 1996/61
 Food Protection (Emergency Prohibitions) (Radioactivity in Sheep) (England) (Partial Revocation) Order 1996 S.I. 1996/62
 A30 Trunk Road (Hounslow and Hillingdon) Red Route (Clearway) Traffic Order 1996 S.I. 1996/63
 A41 Trunk Road (Barnet) Red Route (Prescribed Route) Experimental Traffic Order 1996 S.I. 1996/64
 Civil Courts (Amendment) Order 1996 S.I. 1996/68
 A30 Trunk Road (Great South West Road, Hounslow) Red Route (Prescribed Routes and Prohibitive Turns No. 1) Traffic Order 1996 S.I. 1996/69
 A30 Trunk Road (Great South West Road, Hounslow) Red Route (Prescribed Routes and Prohibitive Turns No. 2) Traffic Order 1996 S.I. 1996/70
 Leeds City Council (Leeds Inner Ring Road Stages 6 & 7 (A61) to M1 Motorway (Junction 46) Connecting Road) Scheme 1994 Confirmation Instrument 1996 S.I. 1996/71
 Leeds City Council (M1 Motorway Junction 46 Slip Road Connecting Road) Scheme 1992 Confirmation Instrument 1996 S.I. 1996/72
 Leeds City Council (Hunslet Viaduct) Scheme 1992 Confirmation Instrument 1996 S.I. 1996/73
 City of Stoke-on-Trent (Lichfield Street Canal Bridge) Scheme, 1995 Confirmation Instrument 1996 S.I. 1996/74
 Merchant Shipping (Distress Signals and Prevention of Collisions) Regulations 1996 S.I. 1996/75
 Civil Aviation Act (Investigation of Accidents) Regulations 1996 S.I. 1996/76
 Local Government Reorganisation (Wales)(Finance) Order 1996 S.I. 1996/88
 London Ambulance Service National Health Service Trust (Establishment) Order 1996 S.I. 1996/90
 Sussex Ambulance Service National Health Service Trust (Transfer of Trust Property) Order 1996 S.I. 1996/91
 Hull and Holderness Community Health National Health Service Trust (Transfer of Trust Property) Order 1996 S.I. 1996/92
 Land Registers (Scotland) Act 1995 (Commencement) Order 1996 S.I. 1996/94
 Non-Domestic Rate (Scotland) Order 1996 S.I. 1996/95
 Offshore Installations (Safety Zones) Order 1996 S.I. 1996/97
 A1 Trunk Road (Haringey) Red Route Traffic Order 1993 Experimental Variation Order 1996 S.I. 1996/98
 A1 Trunk Road (Islington) Red Route Traffic Order 1993 Experimental Variation No.3 Order 1996 S.I. 1996/99

101-200
 Industrial Training Levy (Construction Board) Order 1996 S.I. 1996/101
 Industrial Training Levy (Engineering Construction Board) Order 1996 S.I. 1996/102
 Non-Domestic Rates (Levying) (Scotland) Regulations 1996 S.I. 1996/103
 Tyne Riverside Enterprise Zones (North Tyneside) (Designation) (No. 1) Order 1996 S.I. 1996/106
 Vehicle Excise Duty (Immobilisation, Removal and Disposal of Vehicles) Regulations 1996 S.I. 1996/107
 Education (Grant-maintained Special Schools) (Amendment) Regulations 1996 S.I. 1996/111
 Yorkshire Water services Limited (Drought) Order 1996 S.I. 1996/112
 Housing Revenue Account General Fund Contribution Limits (Scotland) Order 1996 S.I. 1996/115
 Glasgow School of Art (Scotland) Order of Council 1996 S.I. 1996/120
 North Staffordshire Combined Healthcare National Health Service Trust (Transfer of Trust Property) Order 1996 S.I. 1996/124
 Civil Evidence (Family Mediation) (Scotland) Act 1995 (Commencement and Transitional Provision) Order 1996 S.I. 1996/125
 Worthing and Southlands Hospitals National Health Service Trust (Transfer of Trust Property) Order 1996 S.I. 1996/127
 Goods Vehicles (Authorisation of International Journeys) (Fees) Regulations 1995 S.I. 1996/131
 Valuation Appeal Panels and Committees (Scotland) Regulations 1996 S.I. 1996/137
 Local Government Act 1988 (Defined Activities) (Exemption) (Royal Borough of Kingston upon Thames) Order 1996 S.I. 1996/138
 Scottish Environment Protection Agency (Transfer Date) Order 1996 S.I. 1996/139
 Act of Sederunt (Civil Evidence (Family Mediation)) 1996 S.I. 1996/140
 Coast Protection (Notices) (Scotland) Amendment Regulations 1996 S.I. 1996/141
 Tameside (Ashton Northern By-Pass Stage 1 Ashton-Under-Lyne) (Special Roads) Scheme 1994 Confirmation Instrument 1996 S.I. 1996/142
 Health Authorities (Wales) Establishment Order 1996 S.I. 1997/146
 Merchant Shipping (Delegation of Type Approval) Regulations 1996 S.I. 1996/147
 Gateshead Hospitals National Health Service Trust (Transfer of Trust Property) Order 1996 S.I. 1996/148
 Gateshead Healthcare National Health Service Trust (Transfer of Trust Property) Order 1996 S.I. 1996/149
 Local Government Act 1988 (Competition) (Housing Management) (Rossendale) Regulations 1996 S.I. 1996/154
 National Savings Stock Register (Amendment) Regulations 1996 S.I. 1996/156
 County Council of Norfolk (Reconstruction of Acle Wey Bridge) Scheme 1995 Confirmation Instrument 1996 S.I. 1996/158
 County Council of Norfolk (Reconstruction of Acle Wey Bridge—Temporary Bridge) Scheme 1995 Confirmation Instrument 1996 S.I. 1996/159
 Sea Fish Industry Authority (Levy) Regulations 1995 Confirmatory Order 1996 S.I. 1996/160
 Mortgage Indemnities (Recognised Bodies) Order 1996 S.I. 1996/161
 Housing (Right to Buy) (Priority of Charges) Order 1996 S.I. 1996/162
 Road Vehicles (Construction and Use) (Amendment) (No.2) Regulations 1996 S.I. 1996/163
 Air Passenger Duty (Prescribed Rates of Interest) (Amendment) Order 1996 S.I. 1996/164
 Value Added Tax Act 1994 (Interest on Tax)(Prescribed Rate) Order 1996 S.I. 1996/165
 Insurance Premium Tax (Prescribed Rates of Interest) (Amendment) Order 1996 S.I. 1996/166
 Public Service Vehicles (Carrying Capacity) (Amendment) Regulations 1996 S.I. 1996/167
 Local Authorities (Alteration of Requisite Calculations) Regulations 1996 S.I. 1996/175
 Local Government Changes for England (Council Tax) (Transitional Reduction) Regulations 1996 S.I. 1996/176
 National Health Service (General Dental Services) (Scotland) Regulations 1996 S.I. 1996/177
 Contracting Out (Administration of the Teachers' Superannuation Scheme) Order 1995 S.I. 1996/178
 Local Government (Wales) (Alternative Community Names) (Prescribed Steps) Regulations 1996 S.I. 1996/179
 Charities (Exception from Registration) Regulations 1996 S.I. 1996/180
 Social Security (Adjudication) and Child Support Amendment Regulations 1996 S.I. 1996/182
 Local Government Reorganisation (Wales) (Charities) Order 1996 S.I. 1996/183
 Housing (Change of Landlord) (Payment of Disposal Cost by Instalments) (Amendment) Regulations 1996 S.I. 1996/184
 Local Government Pension Scheme (Appropriate Pension Fund) Regulations 1996 S.I. 1996/185
 Environment Act 1995 (Commencement No. 5) Order 1996 S.I. 1996/186
 Land Registration Fees Order 1996 S.I. 1996/187
 Companies Act 1985 (Miscellaneous Accounting Amendments) Regulations 1996 S.I. 1996/189
 Copyright (Certification of Licensing Scheme for Educational Recording of Broadcasts) (Open University Educational Enterprises Limited) (Amendment) Order 1996 S.I. 1996/190
 Copyright (Certification of Licensing Scheme for Educational Recording of Broadcasts and Cable Programmes) (Educational Recording Agency Limited) (Amendment) Order 1996 S.I. 1996/191
 Equipment and Protective Systems Intended for Use in Potentially Explosive Atmospheres Regulations 1996 S.I. 1996/192
 Social Security (Back to Work Bonus) Regulations 1996 S.I. 1996/193
 Housing Benefit, Supply of Information and Council Tax Benefit (Amendment) Regulations 1996 S.I. 1996/194
 Employer's Contributions Re-imbursement Regulations 1996 S.I. 1996/195
 Newlyn Pier and Harbour (Revision of Constitution of Commissioners) Order 1996 S.I. 1996/197

201-300
 A38 Trunk Road (A3064 St Budeaux Bypass Slip Roads) (Trunking) Order 1996 S.I. 1996/201
 Education (Grant) (Henrietta Barnett School) (Amendment) Regulations 1996 S.I. 1996/205
 Income Support (General) (Jobseeker's Allowance Consequential Amendments) Regulations 1996 S.I. 1996/206
 Jobseeker's Allowance Regulations 1996 S.I. 1996/207
 Local Government Act 1988 (Defined Activities) (Exemption) (London Borough of Hillingdon Council) Order 1996 S.I. 1996/208
 Value Added Tax (Amendment) Regulations 1996 S.I. 1996/210
 Motor Vehicles (Driving Licences) (Amendment) Regulations 1996 S.I. 1996/211
 Motor Vehicles (Driving Licences) (Large Goods and Passenger-Carrying Vehicles) (Amendment) Regulations 1996 S.I. 1996/212
 A30 Trunk Road (Great South West Road) (Temporary Restriction of Traffic) Order 1996 S.I. 1996/215
 A41 Trunk Road (Camden) Red Route Experimental Traffic Order 1996 S.I. 1996/216
 A205 Trunk Road (Richmond and Wandsworth) Red Route Experimental Traffic Order 1995 (Amendment No.1) Order 1996 S.I. 1996/217
 Gas Act 1995 (Appointed Day and Commencement) Order 1996 S.I. 1996/218
 Gas Act 1995 (Transitional Provisions and Savings) (No.1) Order 1996 S.I. 1996/219
 Police (Promotion) (Scotland) Regulations 1996 S.I. 1996/221
 Income Tax (Building Societies) (Dividends and Interest) (Amendment) Regulations 1996 S.I. 1996/223
 Farm and Conservation Grant (Variation) Scheme 1996 S.I. 1996/230
 Central Manchester Development Corporation(Planning Functions) Order 1996 S.I. 1996/232
 Central Manchester Development Corporation (Transfer of Property, Rights and Liabilities) Order 1996 S.I. 1996/233
 Environment Agency (Transfer Date) Order 1996 S.I. 1996/234
 Education (Grants for Education Support and Training: Nursery Education) (England) Regulations 1996 S.I. 1996/235
 Act of Sederunt (Fees of Solicitors in the Sheriff Court) (Amendment) 1996 S.I. 1996/236
 Act of Sederunt (Rules of the Court of Session Amendment No.1) (Fees of Solicitors) 1996 S.I. 1996/237
 Act of Sederunt (Copyright, Designs and Patents) (Amendment) 1996 S.I. 1996/238
 Community Drivers' Hours (Passenger and Goods Vehicles) (Temporary Exception) Regulations 1996 S.I. 1996/239
 Drivers' Hours (Passenger and Goods Vehicles) (Exemption) Regulations 1996 S.I. 1996/240
 Child Support Commissioners (Procedure) (Amendment) Regulations 1996 S.I. 1996/243
 Carriage by Air (Sterling Equivalents) Order 1996 S.I. 1996/244
 Sea Fishing (Enforcement of Community Quota Measures) Order 1996 S.I. 1996/247
 Fishing Boats (European Economic Community) Designation (Variation) Order 1996 S.I. 1996/248
 Hinckley College (Dissolution) Order 1996 S.I. 1996/249
 National Health Service (Clinical Negligence Scheme) Regulations 1996 S.I. 1996/251
 Gas Act 1995 (Consequential Modifications of Subordinate Legislation) Order 1996 S.I. 1996/252
 Co-operation of Insolvency Courts (Designation of Relevant Countries) Order 1996 S.I. 1996/253
 Bridgend and District National Health Service Trust (Dissolution) Order 1996 S.I. 1996/255
 Glan Hafren National Health Service Trust (Dissolution) Order 1996 S.I. 1996/256
 Bridgend and District National Health Service Trust (Establishment) Order 1996 S.I. 1996/257
 Glan Hafren National Health Service Trust (Establishment) Order 1996 S.I. 1996/258
 North Glamorgan National Health Service Trust (Establishment) Order 1996 S.I. 1996/259
 Partnerships (Unrestricted Size) No. 11 Regulations 1996 S.I. 1996/262
 Charter Trustees Regulations 1996 S.I. 1996/263
 A316 Trunk Road (Richmond) (No. 2) Red Route Experimental Traffic Order 1996 S.I. 1996/264
 Local Government Act 1988 (Defined Activities) (Specified Periods) (Wales) Regulations 1996 S.I. 1996/265
 European Communities (Designation) Order 1996 S.I. 1996/266
 European Communities (Definition of Treaties) (Statute of the European Schools) Order 1996 S.I. 1996/267
 Bosnia and Herzegovina (High Representative)Order 1996 S.I. 1996/268
 Child Abduction and Custody (Parties to Conventions) (Amendment) Order 1996 S.I. 1996/269
 International Sea-Bed Authority (Immunities and Privileges) Order 1996 S.I. 1996/270
 Medical (Professional Performance) Act 1995 (Commencement No. 1) Order 1996 S.I. 1996/271
 International Tribunal for the Law of the Sea (Immunities and Privileges) Order 1996 S.I. 1996/272
 Transfer of Functions (Registration and Statistics) Order 1996 S.I. 1996/273
 Education (Northern Ireland) Order 1996 S.I. 1996/274
 Gas (Northern Ireland) Order 1996 S.I. 1996/275
 Crown Office (Forms and Proclamations Rules) (Amendment) Order 1996 S.I. 1996/276
 County Courts (Amendment) (Northern Ireland) Order 1996 S.I. 1996/277
 Criminal Justice Act 1988 (Designated Countries and Territories) (Amendment) Order 1996 S.I. 1996/278
 Extradition (Designated Commonwealth Countries) Order 1991 (Amendment) Order 1996 S.I. 1996/279
 Merchant Shipping (Categorisation of Registries of Overseas Territories) (Gibraltar) Order 1996 S.I. 1996/280
 Merchant Shipping (Gibraltar Colours) Order 1996 S.I. 1996/281
 Merchant Shipping (Prevention of Pollution) (Law of the Sea Convention) Order 1996 S.I. 1996/282
 Combined Probation Areas (Shropshire) Order 1996 S.I. 1996/283
 Combined Probation Areas (Gwent and Mid Glamorgan) Order 1996 S.I. 1996/284
 A1 Trunk Road (Barnet) (50 mph Speed Limit) Order 1996 S.I. 1996/285
 Fossil Fuel Levy (Scotland) Regulations 1996 S.I. 1996/293
 Mental Health (After-care under Supervision) Regulations 1996 S.I. 1996/294
 Mental Health (Patients in the Community) (Transfers from Scotland) Regulations 1996 S.I. 1996/295

301-400
 Educational Endowments (Fife Region) Transfer Scheme Order 1996 S.I. 1996/306
 Educational Endowments (Highland Region) Transfer Scheme Order 1996 S.I. 1996/307
 Educational Endowments (Borders Region) Transfer Scheme Order 1996 S.I. 1996/308
 Local Government Reorganisation (Wales) (Council Tax Reduction Scheme) Regulations 1996 S.I. 1996/309
 Council Tax (Demand Notices) (Wales) (Amendment) Regulations 1996 S.I. 1996/310
 Non-Domestic Rating (Demand Notices) (Wales) (Amendment) Regulations 1996 S.I. 1996/311
 Local Government Changes for England (Property Transfer and Transitional Payments) (Amendment) Regulations 1996 S.I. 1996/312
 Transfer of Functions (Foreign Service Allowance) Order 1996 S.I. 1996/313
 Mental Health Review Tribunal (Amendment) Rules 1996 S.I. 1996/314
 Companies (Revision of Defective Accounts and Report) (Amendment) Regulations 1996 S.I. 1996/315
 Wireless Telegraphy (Cordless Telephone Apparatus) (Exemption) Regulations 1996 S.I. 1996/316
 Measuring Instruments (EEC Requirements) (Gas Volume Meters) (Amendment) Regulations 1996 S.I. 1996/319
 Local Government etc. (Scotland) Act 1994 (Commencement No.7 and Savings) Order 1996 S.I. 1996/323
 West Glasgow Hospitals University National Health Service Trust (Establishment) Amendment Order 1996 S.I. 1996/324
 Water Services Charges (Billing and Collection) (Scotland) Order 1996 S.I. 1996/325
 Domestic Sewerage Charges (Reduction) (Scotland) Regulations 1996 S.I. 1996/326
 Local Government Changes for England (Miscellaneous Provision) Regulations 1996 S.I. 1996/330
 Local Government Changes for England (Council Tax) (Transitional Reduction) (Amendment) Regulations 1996 S.I. 1996/333
 Education (Grants for Education Support and Training) (Wales) Regulations 1996 S.I. 1996/334
 Local Government Reorganisation (Wales) (Calculation of Basic Amount of Council Tax) Order 1996 S.I. 1996/335
 Potato Marketing Scheme (Commencement of Revocation Period) Order 1996 S.I. 1996/336
 Agricultural Holdings (Fee) Regulations 1996 S.I. 1996/337
 Health and Safety (Safety Signs and Signals) Regulations 1996 S.I. 1996/341
 Local Authorities (Goods and Services) (Public Bodies) (Trunk Roads) Order 1996 S.I. 1996/342
 Welsh Church Act Funds (Designation and Specification) Order 1996 S.I. 1996/344
 Deregulation (Fair Trading Act 1973) (Amendment) (Merger Reference Time Limits) Order 1996 S.I. 1996/345
 Deregulation (Restrictive Trade Practices Act 1976) (Amendment) (Variation of Exempt Agreements) Order 1996 S.I. 1996/346
 Deregulation (Restrictive Trade Practices Act 1976) (Amendment) (Time Limits) Order 1996 S.I. 1996/347
 Restrictive Trade Practices (Non-notifiable Agreements) (Turnover Threshold) Order 1996 S.I. 1996/348
 Restrictive Trade Practices (Non-notifiable Agreements) (EC Block Exemptions) Order 1996 S.I. 1996/349
 National Health Service Trusts (Originating Capital Debt) Order 1996 S.I. 1996/350
 North Durham Acute Hospitals National Health Service Trust (Transfer of Trust Property) Order 1996 S.I. 1996/351
 Community Health Care: North Durham National Health Service Trust (Transfer of Trust Property) Order 1996 S.I. 1996/352
 Education (Grants for Nursery Education) (England) Regulations 1996 S.I. 1996/353
 Trunk Road (A4) (Great West Road, Hounslow) (Restriction of Traffic) Order 1984 (Variation) Order 1996 S.I. 1996/357
 Education (School Premises) Regulations 1996 S.I. 1996/360
 Gas Act 1995 (Consequential Modifications of Local Acts and Orders) Order 1996 S.I. 1996/362
 Redundancy Payments (Local Government) (Modification) (Amendment) Order 1996 S.I. 1996/372
 Animals, Meat and Meat Products (Examination for Residues and Maximum Residue Limits) (Amendment) Regulations 1996 S.I. 1996/374
 Human Fertilisation and Embryology (Statutory Storage Period for Embryos) Regulations 1996 S.I. 1996/375
 Bath and North East Somerset District Council (Staff Transfer) Order 1996 S.I. 1996/377
 East Riding of Yorkshire District Council (Staff Transfer) Order 1996 S.I. 1996/378
 Wireless Telegraphy (Television Licence Fees) (Amendment) Regulations 1996 S.I. 1996/379
 Coventry Healthcare National Health Service Trust (Transfer of Trust Property) Order 1996 S.I. 1996/380
 Education (School Financial Statements) (Prescribed Particulars etc.) (Amendment and Revocation) Regulations 1996 S.I. 1996/381
 Education (Individual Pupils' Achievements) (Information) (Wales) Regulations 1996 S.I. 1996/382
 South Tyneside Health Care National Health Service Trust (Transfer of Trust Property) Order 1996 S.I. 1996/383
 North Lincolnshire District Council (Staff Transfer) Order 1996 S.I. 1996/384
 Restrictive Trade Practices (Gas Conveyance and Storage) Order 1996 S.I. 1996/385
 North East Lincolnshire District Council (Staff Transfer) Order 1996 S.I. 1996/386
 South Gloucestershire District Council(Staff Transfer) Order 1996 S.I. 1996/387
 North Yorkshire (District of York) (Staff Transfer) Order 1996 S.I. 1996/388
 National Health Service (Dental Charges) Amendment Regulations 1996 S.I. 1996/389
 National Assistance (Sums for Personal Requirements) Regulations 1996 S.I. 1996/391
 National Health Service Trusts (Originating Capital Debt) (Scotland) Order 1996 S.I. 1996/392
 Education (Financial Delegation to Schools) (Mandatory Exceptions) (Revocation and Amendment) Regulations 1996 S.I. 1996/395
 Local Government (Wales) Act 1994 (Commencement No. 7) Order 1996 S.I. 1996/396
 Humberside (Staff Transfer) Order 1996 S.I. 1996/397
 Cleveland (Staff Transfer) Order 1996 S.I. 1996/398
 Gas Act 1995 (Transitional Provisions and Savings) (No. 2) Order 1996 S.I. 1996/399
 Avon (Staff Transfer) Order 1996 S.I. 1996/400

401-500
 University College London Hospitals National Health Service Trust (Establishment) Order 1996 S.I. 1996/401
 North Lincolnshire & East Riding of Yorkshire District Councils (Staff Transfer) Order 1996 S.I. 1996/408
 Local Government Reorganisation (Wales) (Swansea Bay Port Health Authority) (Amendment) Order 1996 S.I. 1996/409
 National Health Service (Travelling Expenses and Remission of Charges) Amendment Regulations 1996 S.I. 1996/410
 Campbeltown (Ferry Terminal) Harbour Revision Order 1996 S.I. 1996/412
 Lyon Court and Office Fees (Variation) Order 1996 S.I. 1996/413
 Local Government Superannuation (Scotland) Amendment Regulations 1996 S.I. 1996/414
 Railways Act 1993 (Consequential Modifications) (No. 5) Order 1996 S.I. 1996/420
 Electricity and Pipe-line Works (Assessment of Environmental Effects) (Amendment) Regulations 1996 S.I. 1996/422
 East Glamorgan National Health Service Trust (Transfer of Trust Property) Order 1996 S.I. 1996/423
 Llandough Hospital and Community National Health Service Trust (Transfer of Trust Property) Order 1996 S.I. 1996/424
 Social Security (Industrial Injuries and Diseases) (Miscellaneous Amendments) Regulations 1996 S.I. 1996/425
 Noise Insulation (Railways and Other Guided Transport Systems) Regulations 1996 S.I. 1996/428
 National Health Service (Travelling Expenses and Remission of Charges) (Scotland) Amendment Regulations 1996 S.I. 1996/429
 Council Tax (Administration and Enforcement) (Scotland) Amendment Regulations 1996 S.I. 1996/430
 National Health Service (Appointment of Consultants) (Wales) Continuation and Transitional Provisions Order 1996 S.I. 1996/433
 Civil Legal Aid (Assessment of Resources) (Amendment) Regulations 1996 S.I. 1996/434
 Legal Advice and Assistance (Amendment) Regulations 1996 S.I. 1996/435
 Legal Aid in Criminal and Care Proceedings (General) (Amendment) Regulations 1996 S.I. 1996/436
 Veterinary Surgeons and Veterinary Practitioners (Registration) (Amendment) RegulationsOrder of Council 1996 S.I. 1996/437
 Sex Discrimination and Equal Pay (Miscellaneous Amendments) Regulations 1996 S.I. 1996/438
 Gas (Calculation of Thermal Energy) Regulations 1996 S.I. 1996/439
 Cardiff Petty Sessional Division (Consequences of Local Government Changes) Order 1996 S.I. 1996/440
 Vale of Glamorgan Petty Sessional Division (Consequences of Local Government Changes) Order 1996 S.I. 1996/441
 Welshpool Petty Sessional Division (Consequences of Local Government Changes) Order 1996 S.I. 1996/442
 A57 Trunk Road (Rotherham/Sheffield Boundary to Swallownest Roundabout) (Detrunking) Order 1996 S.I. 1996/443
 British Nationality (Fees) Regulations 1996 S.I. 1996/444
 Kent (Coroners' Districts) (Amendment) Order 1996 S.I. 1996/445
 Local Government Changes for England (Miscellaneous Provision) Order 1996 S.I. 1996/446
 Food Protection (Emergency Prohibitions) (Oil and Chemical Pollution of Fish and Plants) Order 1996 S.I. 1996/448
 Gas Act 1986 (Exemptions) (No. 1) Order 1996 S.I. 1996/449
 Gas Meters (Information on Connection and Disconnection) Regulations 1996 S.I. 1996/450
 Local Government Changes for England (Staff) (Amendment) Regulations 1996 S.I. 1996/455
 Local Government (Compensation for Redundancy) (Amendment) Regulations 1996 S.I. 1996/456
 Assured and Protected Tenancies (Lettings to Students) (Amendment) Regulations 1996 S.I. 1996/458
 Income-related Benefits Schemes (Miscellaneous Amendments) Regulations 1996 S.I. 1996/462
 Petty Sessional Divisions (West Glamorgan) Order 1996 S.I. 1996/463
 New Town (Cumbernauld) (Transfer of Property, Rights and Liabilities) Order 1996 S.I. 1996/464
 New Town (East Kilbride) (Transfer of Property, Rights and Liabilities) Order 1996 S.I. 1996/465
 New Town (Glenrothes) (Transfer of Property, Rights and Liabilities) Order 1996 S.I. 1996/466
 Town and Country Planning (General Development Procedure) (Scotland) Amendment Order 1996 S.I. 1996/467
 Lotteries (Gaming Board Fees) Order 1996 S.I. 1996/468
 Local Authorities (Members' Allowances) (Amendment) Regulations 1996 S.I. 1996/469
 Gas Act 1995 (Consequential Modifications of Subordinate Legislation) (No. 2) Order 1996 S.I. 1996/470
 Gas Act 1986 (Exemptions) (No. 2) Order 1996 S.I. 1996/471
 National Health Service (Dental Charges) (Scotland) Amendment Regulations 1996 S.I. 1996/472
 National Health Service (Optical Charges and Payments) (Scotland) Amendment Regulations 1996 S.I. 1996/473
 Educational Endowments (Dumfries and Galloway Region) Transfer Scheme Order 1996 S.I. 1996/474
 Educational Endowments (Central Region) Transfer Scheme Order 1996 S.I. 1996/475
 Gas (Applications for Licences and Extensions and Restrictions of Licences) Regulations 1996 S.I. 1996/476
 Educational Endowments (Tayside Region) Transfer Scheme Order 1996 S.I. 1996/477
 Educational Endowments (Grampian Region) Transfer Scheme Order 1996 S.I. 1996/478
 Child Support (Maintenance Assessments and Special Cases) and Social Security (Claims and Payments) Amendment Regulations 1996 S.I. 1996/481
 Medicines (Homoeopathic Medicinal Products for Human Use) Amendment Regulations 1996 S.I. 1996/482
 Social Security (Incapacity for Work) (General) Amendment Regulations 1996 S.I. 1996/484
 Guaranteed Minimum Pensions Increase Order 1996 S.I. 1996/485
 Social Security (Contributions) Amendment Regulations 1996 S.I. 1996/486
 Offshore Safety Act 1992 (Commencement No. 2) Order 1996 S.I. 1996/487
 Authorities for the Ashworth, Broadmoor and Rampton Hospitals (Establishment and Constitution) Order 1996 S.I. 1996/488
 Ashworth, Broadmoor and Rampton Hospital Authorities (Functions and Membership) Regulations 1996 S.I. 1996/489
 Special Hospitals Service Authority (Abolition) Order 1996 S.I. 1996/490
 Gas (Street Works) (Compensation of Small Businesses) Regulations 1996 S.I. 1996/491
 Local Government (Transfer of Children's Hearings Cases) (Scotland) Order 1996 S.I. 1996/492
 Town and Country Planning (Costs of Inquiries etc.) (Standard Daily Amount) (Scotland) Regulations 1996 S.I. 1996/493
 Cardiff (St. Mellons Community) Order 1996 S.I. 1996/494
 Health Authorities (Wales) (Transfer of Trust Property) Order 1996 S.I. 1996/495
 Roads (Transitional Powers) (Scotland) Amendment Order 1996 S.I. 1996/496
 Food (Preparation and Distribution of Meat) (Scotland) Revocation Regulations 1996 S.I. 1996/497
 Financial Services Act 1986 (Gas Industry Exemption) Order 1996 S.I. 1996/498
 Safety of Sports Grounds (Accommodation of Spectators) Order 1996 S.I. 1996/499
 Road Traffic Act 1991 (Amendment of Schedule 3) (England and Wales) Order 1996 S.I. 1996/500

501-600
 Local Government Reorganisation (Wales) (Staff) Order 1996 S.I. 1996/501
 Personal Injuries (Civilians) Amendment Scheme 1996 S.I. 1996/502
 Salford Community Health Care National Health Service Trust (Transfer of Trust Property) Order 1996 S.I. 1996/503
 Council Tax and Non-Domestic Rating (Demand Notices) (England) Amendment Regulations 1996 S.I. 1996/504
 Financial Assistance for Environmental Purposes Order 1996 S.I. 1996/505
 Environmental Protection (Controls on Substances that Deplete the Ozone Layer) Regulations 1996 S.I. 1996/506
 Leicestershire (City of Leicester and District of Rutland) (Structural Change) Order 1996 S.I. 1996/507
 Environmental Licences (Suspension and Revocation) Regulations 1996 S.I. 1996/508
 Statute Law (Repeals) Act 1993 (Commencement) Order 1996 S.I. 1996/509
 Mental Health Review Tribunals (Regions) Order 1996 S.I. 1996/510
 Authorities for London Post-Graduate Teaching Hospitals (Abolition) Order 1996 S.I. 1996/511
 Authorities for London Post-Graduate Teaching Hospitals (Revocation) Regulations 1996 S.I. 1996/512
 Act of Adjournal (Criminal Procedure Rules) 1996 S.I. 1996/513
 Court of Session etc. Fees Amendment Order 1996 S.I. 1996/514
 Qualifications of Chief Social Work Officers (Scotland) Regulations 1996 S.I. 1996/515
 High Court of Justiciary Fees Amendment Order 1996 S.I. 1996/516
 Criminal Justice (Scotland) Act 1995 (Commencement No.2, Transitional Provisions and Savings) Order 1996 S.I. 1996/517
 Lands Tribunal for Scotland (Amendment) (Fees) Rules 1996 S.I. 1996/519
 West Wales Ambulance National Health Service Trust (Transfer of Trust Property) Order 1996 S.I. 1996/522
 West Wales Ambulance National Health Service Trust (Transfer of Trust Property) (No. 2) Order 1996 S.I. 1996/523
 Gwent Community Health National Health Service Trust (Transfer of Trust Property) Order 1996 S.I. 1996/524
 Local Government Reorganisation (Wales) (Consequential Amendments) Order 1996 S.I. 1996/525
 Cardiff Community Healthcare National Health Service Trust (Transfer of Trust Property) Order 1996 S.I. 1996/526
 Velindre Hospital National Health Service Trust (Transfer of Trust Property) Order 1996 S.I. 1996/527
 Town and Country Planning (General Permitted Development) (Amendment) Order 1996 S.I. 1996/528
 Rural Development Grants (Agriculture) (Wales) Regulations 1996 S.I. 1996/529
 University Hospital of Wales Healthcare National Health Service Trust (Transfer of Trust Property) Order 1996 S.I. 1996/530
 Rhondda Health Care National Health Service Trust (Transfer of Trust Property) Order 1996 S.I. 1996/531
 Local Government Reorganisation (Wales) (Property etc.) Order 1996 S.I. 1996/532
 Local Government Reorganisation (Wales) (Rent Officers) Order 1996 S.I. 1996/533
 National Park Authorities (Wales) (Amendment) Order 1996 S.I. 1996/534
 Development Board for Rural Wales (Area) Order 1996 S.I. 1996/535
 Motor Vehicles (Driving Licences) (Amendment) (No.2) Regulations 1996 S.I. 1996/536
 Education (Grant-maintained and Grant-maintained Special Schools) (Finance) (Wales) Regulations 1996 S.I. 1996/537
 Regional Flood Defence Committee (Welsh Region) Order 1996 S.I. 1996/538
 Royal Liverpool Children's Hospital and Community Services National Health Service Trust (Change of Name) Order 1996 S.I. 1996/539
 Mental Health (Hospital, Guardianship and Consent to Treatment) (Amendment) Regulations 1996 S.I. 1996/540
 Value Added Tax (Annual Accounting) Regulations 1996 S.I. 1996/542
 Norfolk and Suffolk Broads (Extension of Byelaws) Order 1996 S.I. 1996/545
 Insurance (Fees) Regulations 1996 S.I. 1996/546
 Local Government Changes for England (Housing Benefit and Council Tax Benefit) Amendment Regulations 1996 S.I. 1996/547
 Local Government Changes for Scotland (Housing Benefit and Council Tax Benefit) Order 1996 S.I. 1996/548
 Local Government Reorganisation (Wales) (Housing Benefit and Council Tax Benefit) Order 1996 S.I. 1996/549
 Gas Safety (Installation and Use) (Amendment) Regulations 1996 S.I. 1996/550
 Gas Safety (Management) Regulations 1996 S.I. 1996/551
 National Health Service (Amendment) Act 1995 (Commencement No. 3) Order 1996 S.I. 1996/552
 London Residuary Body (Winding Up) Order 1996 S.I. 1996/557
 Non-Domestic Rating Contributions (England) (Amendment) Regulations 1996 S.I. 1996/561
 Local Government Changes for England (Finance) (Amendment) Regulations 1996 S.I. 1996/563
 Local Authorities (Capital Finance and Approved Investments) (Amendment) Regulations 1996 S.I. 1996/568
 Financial Assistance For Industry (Increase of Limit) Order 1996 S.I. 1996/569
 Royal West Sussex National Health Service Trust (Transfer of Trust Property) Order 1996 S.I. 1996/570
 Chichester Priority Care Services National Health Service Trust (Transfer of Trust Property) Order 1996 S.I. 1996/571
 Marriage Fees (Scotland) Regulations 1996 S.I. 1996/572
 Injuries in War (Shore Employments) Compensation (Amendment) Scheme 1996 S.I. 1996/573
 Registration of Births, Deaths, Marriages and Divorces (Fees) (Scotland) Amendment Regulations 1996 S.I. 1996/574
 Public Record Office (Fees) Regulations 1996 S.I. 1996/575
 Petty Sessions Areas (Divisions and Names) (Amendment) Regulations 1996 S.I. 1996/576
 Youth Courts (Constitution) (Amendment) Rules 1996 S.I. 1996/577
 Local Authorities (Property Transfer) (Scotland) Amendment Order 1996 S.I. 1996/578
 Scottish Examination Board (Amendment) Regulations 1996 S.I. 1996/579
 Rating, Valuation and Council Tax (Miscellaneous Provisions) (Scotland) Order 1996 S.I. 1996/580
 Local Authorities (Capital Finance) (Rate of Discount for 1996/97) Regulations 1996 S.I. 1996/581
 National Health Service (Optical Charges and Payments) Amendment Regulations 1996 S.I. 1996/582
 National Health Service (Charges for Drugs and Appliances) Amendment Regulations 1996 S.I. 1996/583
 Education (Inner London Education Authority) (Property Transfer) (Modification) Order 1996 S.I. 1996/584
 Local Government (Publication of Information about Unused and Underused Land) (England) (Revocation) Regulations 1996 S.I. 1996/585
 Contracting Out (Management Functions in relation to certain Community Homes) Order 1996 S.I. 1996/586
 Home Energy Efficiency Grants (Amendment) Regulations 1996 S.I. 1996/587
 Civil Courts (Amendment) (No. 2) Order 1996 S.I. 1996/588
 A1 Trunk Road (Islington)(Bus Lanes) Red Route Experimental 1996 S.I. 1996/589
 Accounts and Audit Regulations 1996 S.I. 1996/590
 A1 Trunk Road (Haringey)(Bus Lanes) Red Route Experimental 1996 S.I. 1996/591
 Housing Associations (Permissible Additional Purposes) (England and Wales) Order 1996 S.I. 1996/592
 Environment Act 1995 (Consequential Amendments) Regulations 1996 S.I. 1996/593
 Companies (Forms) (Amendment) Regulations 1996 S.I. 1996/594
 Rheoliadau (Ffurflenni a Dogfenni Cymraeg) Cwmnïau 1996 S.I. 1996/595
 Companies (Welsh Language Forms and Documents) Regulations 1996 S.I. 1996/595
 Misuse of Drugs (Licence Fees) (Amendment) Regulations 1996 S.I. 1996/596
 Social Security (Contributions) (Re-rating and National Insurance Fund Payments) Order 1996 S.I. 1996/597
 Workmen's Compensation (Supplementation) (Amendment) Scheme 1996 S.I. 1996/598
 Social Security Benefits Up-rating Order 1996 S.I. 1996/599
 Energy Information (Washing Machines) Regulations 1996 S.I. 1996/600

601-700
 Energy Information (Tumble Driers) Regulations 1996 S.I. 1996/601
 National Assistance (Assessment of Resources) (Amendment) Regulations 1996 S.I. 1996/602
 Public Airport Companies (Capital Finance) Order 1996 S.I. 1996/604
 Income Support (General) Amendment Regulations 1996 S.I. 1996/606
 Superannuation (Admission to Schedule 1 of the Superannuation Act 1972) Order 1996 S.I. 1996/608
 Building Societies (General Charge and Fees) Regulations 1996 S.I. 1996/609
 Charter Trustees (Amendment) Regulations 1996 S.I. 1996/610
 Local Government Changes for England (Amendment) Regulations 1996 S.I. 1996/611
 Industrial and Provident Societies (Credit Unions) (Amendment of Fees) Regulations 1996 S.I. 1996/612
 Industrial and Provident Societies (Amendment of Fees) Regulations 1996 S.I. 1996/613
 Friendly Societies (General Charge and Fees) Regulations 1996 S.I. 1996/614
 Education (Areas to which Pupils and Students Belong) Regulations 1996 S.I. 1996/615
 Intermediate Diets (Scotland) Order 1996 S.I. 1996/616
 Criminal Justice (Scotland) Act 1987 Fixed Penalty Order 1996 S.I. 1996/617
 Local Government Reorganisation (Wales) (Committees for Sea Fisheries Districts) (Amendment) Order 1996 S.I. 1996/618
 Local Government Reorganisation (Wales) (Finance) (Miscellaneous Amendments and Transitional Provisions) Order 1996 S.I. 1996/619
 Central Rating Lists (Amendment) Regulations 1996 S.I. 1996/620
 Local Authorities (Companies) (Amendment) Order 1996 S.I. 1996/621
 Medical Devices (Consultation Requirements) (Fees) Amendment Regulations 1996 S.I. 1996/622
 National Health Service Contracts (Dispute Resolution) Regulations 1996 S.I. 1996/623
 Health Authorities (England) Establishment Order 1996 S.I. 1996/624
 Criminal Justice and Public Order Act 1994 (Commencement No. 9) Order 1996 S.I. 1996/625
 Jurors (Scotland) Act 1825 (Provision of Information) Order 1996 S.I. 1996/626
 Criminal Legal Aid (Scotland) Amendment Regulations 1996 S.I. 1996/627
 Sheriff Court Fees Amendment Order 1996 S.I. 1996/628
 Educational Endowments (Strathclyde Region) Transfer Scheme Order 1996 S.I. 1996/629
 Educational Endowments (Lothian Region) Transfer Scheme Order 1996 S.I. 1996/630
 Council Tax (Amendment of Housing (Scotland) Act 1987) (Scotland) Regulations 1996 S.I. 1996/631
 Housing (Forms) (Scotland) Amendment Regulations 1996 S.I. 1996/632
 Local Government Reorganisation (Wales) (Capital Finance) Order 1996 S.I. 1996/633
 Waste Management Regulations 1996 S.I. 1996/634
 Child Support Departure Direction (Anticipatory Application) Regulations 1996 S.I. 1996/635
 Council Tax (Discount Disregards) Amendment Order 1996 S.I. 1996/636
 Council Tax (Additional Provisions for Discount Disregards) Amendment Regulations 1996 S.I. 1996/637
 Employment Protection (National Health Service) Order 1996 S.I. 1996/638
 Railway Industry (Employees' Transport Vouchers) (Taxation) Order 1996 S.I. 1996/639
 Community Health Councils Regulations 1996 S.I. 1996/640
 Legal Advice and Assistance (Amendment) (No.2) Regulations 1996 S.I. 1996/641
 Civil Legal Aid (Assessment of Resources) (Amendment) (No. 2) Regulations 1996 S.I. 1996/642
 Legal Aid in Contempt Proceedings (Remuneration) (Amendment) Regulations 1996 S.I. 1996/643
 Legal Aid in Criminal and Care Proceedings (Costs) (Amendment) Regulations 1996 S.I. 1996/644
 Legal Aid in Civil Proceedings (Remuneration) (Amendment) Regulations 1996 S.I. 1996/645
 Legal Aid in Criminal and Care Proceedings (General) (Amendment) (No. 2) Regulations 1996 S.I. 1996/646
 Legal Advice and Assistance (Duty Solicitor) (Remuneration) (Amendment) Regulations 1996 S.I. 1996/647
 Legal Advice and Assistance at Police Stations (Remuneration) (Amendment) Regulations 1996 S.I. 1996/648
 Civil Legal Aid (General) (Amendment) Regulations 1996 S.I. 1996/649
 Legal Aid in Family Proceedings (Remuneration) (Amendment) Regulations 1996 S.I. 1996/650
 Certification Officer (Amendment of Fees) Regulations 1996 S.I. 1996/651
 National Health Service Trusts (Consultation on Establishment and Dissolution) Regulations 1996 S.I. 1996/653
 National Health Service (Functions of Health Authorities in London) Regulations 1996 S.I. 1996/654
 Local Government Reorganisation (Amendment of Coroners Act 1988) Regulations 1996 S.I. 1996/655
 Avon (Coroners) Order 1996 S.I. 1996/656
 Cleveland (Coroners) Order 1996 S.I. 1996/657
 Humberside (Coroners) Order 1996 S.I. 1996/658
 York and North Yorkshire (Coroners) Order 1996 S.I. 1996/659
 Local Government Reorganisation (Compensation for Loss of Remuneration) (Amendment) Regulations 1996 S.I. 1996/660
 Coroners' Districts (Wales) Order 1996 S.I. 1996/661
 Coroners' Districts (Designation of Relevant Councils) (Wales) Order 1996 S.I. 1996/662
 Social Security (Contributions) Amendment (No. 2) Regulations 1996 S.I. 1996/663
 Railways Act 1993 (Extinguishment of Relevant Loans) (Railtrack plc) Order 1996 S.I. 1996/664
 Nuclear Generating Stations (Security) Regulations 1996 S.I. 1996/665
 Regional Health Authorities (Transfer of Trust Property) Order 1996 S.I. 1996/666
 Environmental Protection (Applications, Appeals and Registers) (Amendment) Regulations 1996 S.I. 1996/667
 Statutory Maternity Pay (Compensation of Employers) Amendment Regulations 1996 S.I. 1996/668
 National Health Service (Functions of Health Authorities) (Complaints) Regulations 1996 S.I. 1996/669
 Social Security Benefits Up-rating Regulations 1996 S.I. 1996/670
 Social Security (Industrial Injuries) (Dependency) (Permitted Earnings Limits) Order 1996 S.I. 1996/671
 Social Security (Claims and Payments Etc.) Amendment Regulations 1996 S.I. 1996/672
 Exchange Gains and Losses (Insurance Companies) (Amendment) Regulations 1996 S.I. 1996/673
 Local Government Changes for England (Magistrates' Courts) Regulations 1996 S.I. 1996/674
 Magistrates' Courts (Wales) (Consequences of Local Government Changes) Order 1996 S.I. 1996/675
 Commission Areas (Gwent, Mid Glamorgan and South Glamorgan) Order 1996 S.I. 1996/676
 Housing Benefit (Permitted Totals) Order 1996 S.I. 1996/677
 Council Tax Benefit (Permitted Totals) Order 1996 S.I. 1996/678
 Sugar Beet (Research and Education) Order 1996 S.I. 1996/679
 Scottish Land Court (Fees) Order 1996 S.I. 1996/680
 Accounts Commission (Scotland) Regulations 1996 S.I. 1996/681
 Local Government (Transitional Financial Provisions) (Scotland) Order 1996 S.I. 1996/682
 Medicines (Products for Human Use—Fees) Amendment Regulations 1996 S.I. 1996/683
 National Health Service (Existing Liabilities Scheme) Regulations 1996 S.I. 1996/686
 Civil Aviation (Canadian Navigation Services) Regulations 1996 S.I. 1996/688
 Civil Aviation (Navigation Services Charges) (Amendment) Regulations 1996 S.I. 1996/689
 Measuring Instruments (EEC Requirements) (Fees) (Amendment) Regulations 1996 S.I. 1996/690
 Local Government Changes for England (Finance—Social Services Grants) Regulations 1996 S.I. 1996/691
 Children (Homes and Secure Accommodation) (Miscellaneous Amendments) Regulations 1996 S.I. 1996/692
 Isles of Scilly (Carers) Order 1996 S.I. 1996/693
 Plastic Materials and Articles in Contact with Food (Amendment) Regulations 1996 S.I. 1996/694
 Countryside Stewardship Regulations 1996 S.I. 1996/695
 Common Agricultural Policy (Wine) Regulations 1996 S.I. 1996/696
 Diseases of Animals (Approved Disinfectants) (Amendment) Order 1996 S.I. 1996/697
 National Health Service (Pharmaceutical Services) Amendment Regulations 1996 S.I. 1996/698
 Police (Amendment) Regulations 1996 S.I. 1996/699
 Social Security (Contributions) Amendment (No. 3) Regulations 1996 S.I. 1996/700

701-800
 National Health Service (Appointment of Consultants) Regulations 1996 S.I. 1996/701
 National Health Service (General Medical Services) Amendment Regulations 1996 S.I. 1996/702
 National Health Service (Service Committees and Tribunal) Amendment Regulations 1996 S.I. 1996/703
 National Health Service (General Dental Services) Amendment Regulations 1996 S.I. 1996/704
 National Health Service (General Ophthalmic Services) Amendment Regulations 1996 S.I. 1996/705
 National Health Service (Fund-holding Practices) Regulations 1996 S.I. 1996/706
 Health Authorities (Membership and Procedure) Regulations 1996 S.I. 1996/707
 National Health Service (Functions of Health Authorities and Administration Arrangements) Regulations 1996 S.I. 1996/708
 Health Authorities Act 1995 (Transitional Provisions) Order 1996 S.I. 1996/709
 Local Government Changes for England (Education) (Miscellaneous Provisions) Regulations 1996 S.I. 1996/710
 Local Government Pension Scheme (Environment Agency) Regulations 1996 S.I. 1996/711
 Council Tax (Deductions from Income Support) Regulations 1993 Amendment Order 1996 S.I. 1996/712
 Cambridge Water Company (Constitution and Regulation) Order 1996 S.I. 1996/713
 Trade Marks (International Registration) Order 1996 S.I. 1996/714
 Trade Marks (International Registration) (Fees) Rules 1996 S.I. 1996/715
 United Nations (International Tribunal) (Former Yugoslavia) Order 1996 S.I. 1996/716
 Health Service Commissioner for England (Authorities for the Ashworth, Broadmoor and Rampton Hospitals) Order 1996 S.I. 1996/717
 Air Force Act 1955 (Bailiwick of Guernsey) Order 1996 S.I. 1996/718
 Air Force Act 1955 (Isle of Man) Order 1996 S.I. 1996/719
 Air Force Act 1955 (Jersey) Order 1996 S.I. 1996/720
 Appropriation (Northern Ireland) Order 1996 S.I. 1996/721
 Army Act 1955 (Bailiwick of Guernsey) Order 1996 S.I. 1996/722
 Army Act 1955 (Isle of Man) Order 1996 S.I. 1996/723
 Army Act 1955 (Jersey) Order 1996 S.I. 1996/724
 Business Tenancies (Northern Ireland) Order 1996 S.I. 1996/725
 Naval Discipline Act 1957 (Bailiwick of Guernsey) Order 1996 S.I. 1996/726
 Naval Discipline Act 1957 (Isle of Man) Order 1996 S.I. 1996/727
 Naval Discipline Act 1957 (Jersey) Order 1996 S.I. 1996/728
 Trade Marks Act 1994 (Isle of Man) Order 1996 S.I. 1996/729
 Double Taxation Relief (Taxes on Estates of Deceased Persons and Inheritances and on Gifts) (Netherlands) Order 1996 S.I. 1996/730
 Lord-Lieutenants (Scotland) Order 1996 S.I. 1996/731
 Naval, Military and Air Forces etc. (Disablement and Death) Service Pensions Amendment Order 1996 S.I. 1996/732
 Local Authorities (Armorial Bearings) (Wales) Order 1996 S.I. 1996/733
 Education (Grants for Education Support and Training) (England) Regulations 1996 S.I. 1996/734
 Richmond Adult and Community College (Incorporation) Order 1996 S.I. 1996/735
 Richmond Adult and Community College (Government) Regulations 1996 S.I. 1996/736
 Wiltshire Health Care National Health Service Trust (Transfer of Trust Property) Order 1996 S.I. 1996/737
 Environmentally Sensitive Areas (Breadalbane) Designation (Amendment) Order 1996 S.I. 1996/738
 Local Government (Transitional and Consequential Provisions and Revocations) (Scotland) Order 1996 S.I. 1996/739
 National Health Service (Charges for Drugs and Appliances) (Scotland) Amendment Regulations 1996 S.I. 1996/740
 Housing (Valuation Bands for Improvement and Repairs Grants) (Scotland) Order 1996 S.I. 1996/741
 Mental Health (Patients in the Community) (Transfer from England and Wales to Scotland) Regulations 1996 S.I. 1996/742
 Mental Health (Prescribed Forms) (Scotland) Regulations 1996 S.I. 1996/743
 Water and Sewerage Authorities (Rate of Return) (Scotland) Order 1996 S.I. 1996/744
 Common Police Services (Scotland) Order 1996 S.I. 1996/745
 Council Tax (Reduction of Liability) (Scotland) Regulations 1996 S.I. 1996/746
 Local Authorities (Discretionary Expenditure) (Scotland) Regulations 1996 S.I. 1996/747
 National Health Service (Fund-Holding Practices) (Scotland) Amendment Regulations 1996 S.I. 1996/748
 Forth and Tay Road Bridge Order Confirmation Acts (Modification) Order 1996 S.I. 1996/749
 Land Registry Trading Fund (Additional Assets) Order 1996 S.I. 1996/750
 Plant Health (Forestry) (Great Britain) (Amendment) Order 1996 S.I. 1996/751
 Gas (Extent of Domestic Supply Licences) Order 1996 S.I. 1996/752
 European Parliamentary Elections (Returning Officers) (Scotland) Order 1996 S.I. 1996/753
 Act of Sederunt (Rules of the Court of Session Amendment No.2) (Fees of Shorthand Writers) 1996 S.I. 1996/754
 Local Government Finance (Scotland) Order 1996 S.I. 1996/755
 Revenue Support Grant (Scotland) Order 1996 S.I. 1996/756
 Education (Grants) (Purcell School) Regulations 1996 S.I. 1996/757
 Act of Sederunt (Fees of Shorthand Writers in the Sheriff Court) (Amendment) 1996 S.I. 1996/767
 Medicines (Medicated Animal Feeding Stuffs) (Amendment) Regulations 1996 S.I. 1996/769
 Local Government Act 1988 (Defined Activities) (Exemptions) (England and Wales) Order 1996 S.I. 1996/770
 Adventure Activities (Licensing) (Designation) Order 1996 S.I. 1996/771
 Adventure Activities Licensing Regulations 1996 S.I. 1996/772
 Hydrographic Office Trading Fund Order 1996 S.I. 1996/773
 Meteorological Office Trading Fund Order 1996 S.I. 1996/774
 Occupational Pension Schemes (Discharge of Protected Rights on Winding Up) Regulations 1996 S.I. 1996/775
 Personal and Occupational Pension Schemes (Miscellaneous Amendments) Regulations 1996 S.I. 1996/776
 Social Security Contributions, Statutory Maternity Pay and Statutory Sick Pay (Miscellaneous Amendments) Regulations 1996 S.I. 1996/777
 Pensions Act 1995 (Commencement No. 3) Order 1996 S.I. 1996/778
 Inter-American Development Bank (Eighth General Increase) Order 1995 S.I. 1996/779
 Police Grant (Scotland) Order 1996 S.I. 1996/780
 Lloyd's Underwriters (Tax) (Amendment) Regulations 1996 S.I. 1996/781
 Lloyd's Underwriters (Tax) (1992-93 to 1996-97) (Amendment) Regulations 1996 S.I. 1996/782
 Double Taxation Relief (Taxes on Income) (General) (Amendment) Regulations 1996 S.I. 1996/783
 Local Government (Direct Labour Organisations) (Accounts) (Scotland) Regulations 1996 S.I. 1996/784
 Children Act 1989 (Amendment) (Children's Services Planning) Order 1996 S.I. 1996/785
 Humberside (Coroners) (Amendment) Order 1996 S.I. 1996/787
 Weighing Equipment (Filling and Discontinuous Totalising Automatic Weighing Machines) (Amendment) Regulations 1996 S.I. 1996/797
 Pensions Increase (Review) Order 1996 S.I. 1996/800

801-900
 National Savings Bank (Amendment) Regulations 1996 S.I. 1996/801
 A21 Trunk Road (Tonbridge Bypass to Pembury Bypass Dualling) Order 1996 S.I. 1996/802
 Income Tax (Employments) (Amendment) Regulations 1996 S.I. 1996/804
 Personal Pension Schemes (Deferred Annuity Purchase) (Acceptance of Contributions) Regulations 1996 S.I. 1996/805
 A21 Trunk Road (Tonbridge Bypass To Pembury Bypass Dualling Slip Roads) Order 1996 S.I. 1996/807
 A21 Trunk Road (Tonbridge Bypass to Pembury Bypass Dualling) (Detrunking) Order 1996 S.I. 1996/808
 Advice and Assistance (Scotland) Amendment Regulations 1996 S.I. 1996/811
 Civil Legal Aid (Scotland) Amendment Regulations 1996 S.I. 1996/812
 Housing Support Grant (Scotland) Order 1996 S.I. 1996/813
 Housing Support Grant (Scotland) Variation Order 1996 S.I. 1996/814
 A41 Trunk Road (Barnet) Red Route (Clearway) (No 1) Traffic Order 1996 S.I. 1996/815
 Family Proceedings (Amendment) Rules 1996 S.I. 1996/816
 A41 Trunk Road (Barnet) Red Route (Clearway) (No. 2) Traffic Order 1996 S.I. 1996/817
 A41 Trunk Road (Barnet) Red Route (Clearway) (No. 3) Traffic Order 1996 S.I. 1996/818
 A1 Trunk Road (Barnet) Red Route (Clearway) Traffic Order 1996 S.I. 1996/819
 A406 Trunk Road (Barnet) Red Route (Clearway) Traffic Order 1996 S.I. 1996/820
 A406 Trunk Road (Barnet) Red Route Experimental Traffic Order 1996 S.I. 1996/821
 A501 Trunk Road (Marylebone Road, Westminster) (Temporary Prohibition of Traffic) Order 1996 S.I. 1996/822
 Local Government Act 1988 (Defined Activities) (Specified Period) (Redbridge London Borough Council) Regulations 1996 S.I. 1996/823
 Northumbrian and North East Water (Amendment of Local Enactments Etc.) Order 1996 S.I. 1996/824
 Pipelines Safety Regulations 1996 S.I. 1996/825
 Diseases of Animals (Waste Food) (Amendment) Order 1996 S.I. 1996/826
 Animal By-Products (Amendment) Order 1996 S.I. 1996/827
 Solent Oyster Fishery (Variation) (Clams) Order 1996 S.I. 1996/828
 Income Tax (Charge to Tax) (Payments out of Surplus Funds) (Relevant Rate) Order 1996 S.I. 1996/830
 National Health Service (Pharmaceutical Services) (Scotland) Amendment Regulations 1996 S.I. 1996/840
 National Health Service (General Dental Services) (Scotland) Amendment Regulations 1996 S.I. 1996/841
 National Health Service (General Medical Services) (Scotland) Amendment Regulations 1996 S.I. 1996/842
 National Health Service (General Ophthalmic Services) (Scotland) Amendment Regulations 1996 S.I. 1996/843
 Tax-exempt Special Savings Account (Amendment) Regulations 1996 S.I. 1996/844
 Trustee Investments (Division of Trust Fund) Order 1996 S.I. 1996/845
 Personal Equity Plan (Amendment) Regulations 1996 S.I. 1996/846
 Sussex Sea Fisheries District (Variation) Order 1996 S.I. 1996/847
 Deregulation (Corn Returns Act 1882) Order 1996 S.I. 1996/848
 Offshore Installations (Safety Zones) (No. 2) Order 1996 S.I. 1996/850
 Central Manchester Development Corporation (Area and Constitution) Order 1996 S.I. 1996/851
 A2 Trunk Road (West of Rochester) Detrunking Order 1996 S.I. 1996/853
 M2 Motorway (West of Rochester Section) Scheme 1996 S.I. 1996/854
 Food Protection (Emergency Prohibitions) (Oil and Chemical Pollution of Salmon and Migratory Trout) Order 1996 S.I. 1996/856
 Local Government Act 1988 (Personnel Services) (Exemption) (England and Wales) Order 1996 S.I. 1996/857
 Contracting Out (Functions in relation to the provision of Guardians Ad Litem and Reporting Officers Panels) Order 1996 S.I. 1996/858
 Police Pensions (Amendment) Regulations 1996 S.I. 1996/867
 Royal Free Hampstead National Health Service Trust (Amendment) Order 1996 S.I. 1996/871
 Lincoln Hospitals National Health Service Trust (Change of Name) Order 1996 S.I. 1996/872
 Hartlepool and East Durham National Health Service Trust (Establishment) Order 1996 S.I. 1996/873
 Worcestershire Community Healthcare National Health Service Trust (Establishment) Order 1996 S.I. 1996/874
 South Durham National Health Service Trust (Establishment) Order 1996 S.I. 1996/875
 South West Durham Mental Health National Health Service Trust Dissolution Order 1996 S.I. 1996/876
 Louth and District Healthcare National Health Service Trust Dissolution Order 1996 S.I. 1996/877
 Secretary of State's Trunk Road Functions (Contracting Out) (Scotland) Order 1996 S.I. 1996/878
 Hartlepool and Peterlee Hospitals National Health Service Trust Dissolution Order 1996 S.I. 1996/879
 South Durham Health Care National Health Service Trust Dissolution Order 1996 S.I. 1996/880
 University College London Hospitals National Health Service Trust Dissolution Order 1996 S.I. 1996/881
 Birmingham Heartlands Hospital National Health Service Trust Dissolution Order 1996 S.I. 1996/882
 Birmingham Heartlands and Solihull (Teaching) National Health Service Trust (Establishment) Order 1996 S.I. 1996/883
 South Worcestershire Community National Health Service Trust Dissolution Order 1996 S.I. 1996/884
 North East Worcestershire Community Health Care National Health Service Trust Dissolution Order 1996 S.I. 1996/885
 Royal National Throat, Nose and Ear Hospital National Health Service Trust Dissolution Order 1996 S.I. 1996/886
 Hartlepool Community Care National Health Service Trust Dissolution Order 1996 S.I. 1996/887
 Protection of Water Against Agricultural Nitrate Pollution (England and Wales) Regulations 1996 S.I. 1996/888
 Education (Grant-maintained and Grant-maintained Special Schools) (Finance) Regulations 1996 S.I. 1996/889
 Marking of Plastic Explosives for Detection Regulations 1996 S.I. 1996/890
 Prevention of Terrorism (Temporary Provisions) Act 1989 (Continuance) Order 1996 S.I. 1996/891
 Prevention of Terrorism (Exclusion Orders) Regulations 1996 S.I. 1996/892
 Returning Officers (Parliamentary Constituencies) (Wales) Order 1996 S.I. 1996/897
 Returning Officers (Parliamentary Constituencies) (England) (Amendment) Order 1996 S.I. 1996/898

901-1000
 A41 Trunk Road (Gloucester Place, Westminster) (Temporary Prohibition of Traffic) Order 1996 S.I. 1996/903
 Broadcasting (Prescribed Countries) Order 1996 S.I. 1996/904
 Local Government Reorganisation (Wales) (Staff) (No. 2) Order 1996 S.I. 1996/905
 Local Government Reorganisation (Wales) (Property etc.) (Amendment) Order 1996 S.I. 1996/906
 East Surrey and Sutton District Water (Amendment of Local Enactments Etc.) Order 1996 S.I. 1996/907
 Farm Waste Grant (Nitrate Vulnerable Zones) (England and Wales) Scheme 1996 S.I. 1996/908
 Income Support (General) Amendment (No. 2) Regulations 1996 S.I. 1996/909
 Local Government Reorganisation (Wales) (Capital Finance and Miscellaneous Provisions) Order 1996 S.I. 1996/910
 Non-Domestic Rating (Chargeable Amounts) (Amendment) Regulations 1996 S.I. 1996/911
 Electricity Supply Industry and Water Undertakers (Rateable Values) Amendment Order 1996 S.I. 1996/912
 Offshore Installations and Wells (Design and Construction, etc.) Regulations 1996 S.I. 1996/913
 Waste Management Licensing (Scotland) Regulations 1996 S.I. 1996/916
 Local Government Act 1988 (Defined Activities) (Specified Periods) (Scotland) Regulations 1996 S.I. 1996/917
 Local Government Finance Act 1992 (Commencement No.10) Order 1996 S.I. 1996/918
 Environmentally Sensitive Areas (Somerset Levels and Moors) Designation (Amendment) Order 1996 S.I. 1996/920
 Environmentally Sensitive Areas (The Broads) Designation (Amendment) Order 1996 S.I. 1996/921
 Environmentally Sensitive Areas (West Penwith) Designation (Amendment) Order 1996 S.I. 1996/922
 Environmentally Sensitive Areas (Pennine Dales) Designation (Amendment) Order 1996 S.I. 1996/923
 Environmentally Sensitive Areas (South Downs) Designation (Amendment) Order 1996 S.I. 1996/924
 A205 Trunk Road (Mortlake Road, Richmond upon Thames) (Vehicle Height Restriction) Order 1996 S.I. 1996/925
 A16 Trunk Road (Fotherby Bypass) Order 1996 S.I. 1996/926
 A41 Trunk Road (Park Road, Westminster) (Temporary Prohibition of Traffic) Order 1996 S.I. 1996/929
 Combined Probation Areas (Suffolk) Order 1996 S.I. 1996/930
 Combined Probation Areas (Nottinghamshire) Order 1996 S.I. 1996/931
 Combined Probation Areas (Hampshire) Order 1996 S.I. 1996/932
 Combined Probation Areas (Derbyshire) Order 1996 S.I. 1996/933
 Elsecar Steam Railway Order 1996 S.I. 1996/937
 National Health Service (Service Committees and Tribunal) (Scotland) Amendment Regulations 1996 S.I. 1996/938
 Social Security Benefits (Maintenance Payments and Consequential Amendments) Regulations 1996 S.I. 1996/940
 Passenger and Goods Vehicles (Recording Equipment) Regulations 1996 S.I. 1996/941
 Insurance Companies (Amendment) Regulations 1996 S.I. 1996/942
 Insurance Companies (Accounts and Statements) Regulations 1996 S.I. 1996/943
 Insurance Companies (Amendment No. 2) Regulations 1996 S.I. 1996/944
 Insurance Companies (Reserves) Act 1995 (Commencement) Order 1996 S.I. 1996/945
 Insurance Companies (Reserves) Regulations 1996 S.I. 1996/946
 Deregulation (Length of the School Day) Order 1996 S.I. 1996/951
 Combined Probation Areas (West Glamorgan) Order 1996 S.I. 1996/956
 Combined Probation Areas (West Sussex) Order 1996 S.I. 1996/957
 Motor Vehicles (Type Approval and Approval Marks) (Fees) Regulations 1996 S.I. 1996/958
 Rent Officers (Additional Functions) (Amendment) Order 1996 S.I. 1996/959
 London Cab Order 1996 S.I. 1996/960
 Beef (Emergency Control) Order 1996 1996/961
 Bovine Spongiform Encephalopathy (Amendment) Order 1996 S.I. 1996/962
 Specified Bovine Material Order 1996 S.I. 1996/963
 Housing Benefit (General) Amendment Regulations 1996 S.I. 1996/965
 Central Manchester Development Corporation (Dissolution) Order 1996 S.I. 1996/966
 Genetically Modified Organisms (Contained Use) (Amendment) Regulations 1996 S.I. 1996/967
 National Health Service Litigation Authority (Amendment) Regulations 1996 S.I. 1996/968
 Regional Health Authorities (Transfer of Trust Property) Amendment Order 1996 S.I. 1996/969
 Health Service Commissioners (Amendment) Act 1996 (Commencement) Order 1996 S.I. 1996/970
 Health Authorities Act 1995 (Amendment of Transitional Provisions and Modification of References) Order 1996 S.I. 1996/971
 Special Waste Regulations 1996 S.I. 1996/972
 Environment Act 1995 (Consequential and Transitional Provisions) (Scotland) Regulations 1996 S.I. 1996/973
 Local Government (Translation Amendments) (Scotland) Order 1996 S.I. 1996/974
 Rent Officers (Additional Functions) (Scotland) Amendment Order 1996 S.I. 1996/975
 Chester–Holyhead Trunk Road (A55) (Llanfair Pwllgwyngyll to Bryngwran) Order 1996 S.I. 1996/976
 Deregulation (Special Hours Certificates) Order 1996 S.I. 1996/977
 Licensing (Special Hours Certificates) (Amendment) Rules 1996 S.I. 1996/978
 Environmental Protection (Applications, Appeals and Registers) (Amendment No. 2) Regulations 1996 S.I. 1996/979
 Income Tax (Employments) (Amendment No. 2) Regulations 1996 S.I. 1996/980
 Income Tax (Sub-contractors in the Construction Industry) (Amendment) Regulations 1996 S.I. 1996/981
 Walton Centre for Neurology and Neurosurgery National Health Service Trust (Establishment) Amendment Order 1996 S.I. 1996/982
 South Manchester University Hospitals National Health Service Trust (Establishment) Amendment Order 1996 S.I. 1996/983
 North Durham Acute Hospitals National Health Service Trust (Establishment) Amendment Order 1996 S.I. 1996/984
 West Middlesex University Hospitals National Health Service Trust (Establishment) Amendment Order 1996 S.I. 1996/985
 Gloucestershire Royal National Health Service Trust (Establishment) Amendment Order 1996 S.I. 1996/986
 Swindon and Marlborough National Health Service Trust (Establishment) Amendment Order 1996 S.I. 1996/987
 Hull and Holderness Community Health National Health Service Trust (Establish ment) Amendment Order 1996 S.I. 1996/988
 Bishop Auckland Hospitals National Health Service Trust (Establishment) Amendment Order 1996 S.I. 1996/989
 Hereford Hospitals National Health Service Trust (Establishment) Amendment Order 1996 S.I. 1996/990
 Rochdale Healthcare National Health Service Trust (Establishment) Amendment Order 1996 S.I. 1996/991
 Wellhouse National Health Service Trust (Establishment) Amendment Order 1996 S.I. 1996/992
 Essex Rivers Healthcare National Health Service Trust (Establishment) Amendment Order 1996 S.I. 1996/993
 Dartford and Gravesham National Health Service Trust (Establishment) Amendment Order 1996 S.I. 1996/994
 Private International Law (Miscellaneous Provisions) Act 1995 (Commencement) Order 1996 S.I. 1996/995
 St James's and Seacroft University Hospitals National Health Service Trust (Establishment) Amendment Order 1996 S.I. 1996/996
 Thameside Community Health Care National Health Service Trust (Establishment) Amendment Order 1996 S.I. 1996/997
 South Buckinghamshire National Health Service Trust (Establishment) Amendment Order 1996 S.I. 1996/998
 South Devon Health Care National Health Service Trust (Establishment) Amendment Order 1996 S.I. 1996/999
 Bexley Community Health National Health Service Trust (Establishment) Amendment Order 1996 S.I. 1996/1000

1001-1100
 Norfolk and Norwich Health Care National Health Service Trust (Establishment) Amendment Order 1996 S.I. 1996/1001
 East Yorkshire Community Healthcare National Health Service Trust (Establishment) Amendment Order 1996 S.I. 1996/1002
 Education (School Teachers' Pay and Conditions) Order 1996 S.I. 1996/1003
 Registers of Scotland Executive Agency Trading Fund Order 1996 S.I. 1996/1004
 Sheriff Court Districts (Alteration of Boundaries) Order 1996 S.I. 1996/1005
 Sheriffdoms (Alteration of Boundaries) Order 1996 S.I. 1996/1006
 Regional Flood Defence Committee (Welsh Region) (Amendment) Order 1996 S.I. 1996/1007
 Local Government Reorganisation (Wales) (Consequential Amendments No. 2) Order 1996 S.I. 1996/1008
 Criminal Legal Aid (Scotland) (Prescribed Proceedings) Amendment Regulations 1996 S.I. 1996/1009
 Advice and Assistance (Financial Conditions) (Scotland) Regulations 1996 S.I. 1996/1010
 Advice and Assistance (Assistance by Way of Representation) (Scotland) Amendment Regulations 1996 S.I. 1996/1011
 Civil Legal Aid (Financial Conditions) (Scotland) Regulations 1996 S.I. 1996/1012
 Lloyd's Underwriters (Gilt-edged Securities) (Periodic Accounting for Tax on Interest) (Amendment) Regulations 1996 S.I. 1996/1014
 Gilt-edged Securities (Periodic Accounting for Tax on Interest) (Amendment) Regulations 1996 S.I. 1996/1015
 Lands Tribunal (Fees) Rules 1996 S.I. 1996/1021
 Lands Tribunal Rules 1996 S.I. 1996/1022
 Employment Protection (Continuity of Employment of National Health Service Employees) (Modification) Order 1996 S.I. 1996/1023
 Magistrates' Courts Committees (Bolton, Bury, Rochdale, Salford and Wigan) Amalgamation Order 1996 S.I. 1996/1024
 A501 Trunk Road (Marylebone Road, Westminster) (Temporary Prohibition of Traffic) (No. 2) Order 1996 S.I. 1996/1027
 Superannuation (Admission to Schedule 1 of the Superannuation Act 1972) (No. 2) Order 1996 S.I. 1996/1029
 Environment Act 1995 (Isles of Scilly) Order 1996 S.I. 1996/1030
 Capital Gains Tax (Gilt-edged Securities) Order 1996 S.I. 1996/1031
 North Eastern Sea Fisheries District (Constitution of Committee and Expenses) (Variation) Order 1996 S.I. 1996/1034
 Fishing Boats (Specified Countries) Designation Order 1996 S.I. 1996/1035
 Third Country Fishing (Enforcement) Order 1996 S.I. 1996/1036
 Beef (Emergency Control) (Amendment) Order 1996 S.I. 1996/1043
 A23 Trunk Road (Purley Cross Junction Improvement) Trunking Order 1996 S.I. 1996/1046
 Social Security (Contributions) Amendment (No. 4) Regulations 1996 S.I. 1996/1047
 Social Security (Reduced Rates of Class 1 Contributions) (Salary Related Contracted-out Schemes) Order 1996 S.I. 1996/1054
 Social Security (Reduced Rates of Class 1 Contributions and Rebates) (Money Purchase Contracted-out Schemes) Order 1996 S.I. 1996/1055
 Social Security (Minimum Contributions to Appropriate Personal Pension Schemes) Order 1996 S.I. 1996/1056
 Licensing (Fees) (Amendment) Order 1996 S.I. 1996/1063
 Local Government Act 1988 (Defined Activities) (Exemption) (Stockport Borough Council) Order 1996 S.I. 1996/1064
 New Town (Glenrothes) Dissolution Order 1996 S.I. 1996/1065
 New Town (East Kilbride) Dissolution Order 1996 S.I. 1996/1066
 Statutory Nuisance (Appeals) (Scotland) Regulations 1996 S.I. 1996/1076
 A41 Trunk Road (Gloucester Place/Ivor Place, Westminster) (Temporary Prohibition of Traffic) Order 1996 S.I. 1996/1077
 A501 Trunk Road (Grays Inn Road, Camden) (Temporary Prohibition of Traffic) Order 1996 S.I. 1996/1078
 Buying Agency Trading Fund (Amendment) Order 1996 S.I. 1996/1080
 A406 Trunk Road (Ealing and Hounslow) Red Route Experimental Traffic Order 1996 S.I. 1996/1088
 A406 Trunk Road (North Circular Road, Ealing) Red Route (Prescribed Routes and Turns No 1) Experimental Traffic Order 1996 S.I. 1996/1089
 A406 Trunk Road (North Circular Road, Hounslow) Red Route (Prescribed Route No. 1) Experimental Traffic Order 1996 S.I. 1996/1090
 Beef (Emergency Control) (Amendment) (No. 2) Order 1996 S.I. 1996/1091
 Chemicals (Hazard Information and Packaging for Supply) (Amendment) Regulations 1996 S.I. 1996/1092
 North of Scotland Milk Marketing Board Dissolution Order 1996 S.I. 1996/1093
 Aberdeen and District Milk Marketing Board Dissolution Order 1996 S.I. 1996/1094
 Bath-Lincoln Trunk Road A46 (Upper Swainswick to A420 Cold Ashton Roundabout) Orders 1987 Revocation Order 1996 S.I. 1996/1097
 A629 Trunk Road (Skipton To Kildwick Improvement and Slip Roads) Order 1996 S.I. 1996/1100

1101-1200
 A629 Trunk Road (Ings Lane to Cononley Lane) (Detrunking) Order 1996 S.I. 1996/1101
 Prohibition of Keeping of Live Fish (Crayfish) Order 1996 S.I. 1996/1104
 Companies (Principal Business Activities) (Amendment) Regulations 1996 S.I. 1996/1105
 Genetically Modified Organisms (Risk Assessment) (Records and Exemptions) Regulations 1996 S.I. 1996/1106
 Prohibition of Keeping of Live Fish (Crayfish) (Scotland) Order 1996 S.I. 1996/1107
 Smoke Control Areas (Exempted Fireplaces) Order 1996 S.I. 1996/1108
 Gaming Clubs (Hours and Charges) (Amendment) Regulations 1996 S.I. 1996/1109
 Road Traffic (Special Parking Area) (Royal Borough of Kingston upon Thames) (Amendment) Order 1996 S.I. 1996/1110
 Animals and Animal Products (Import and Export) (Amendment) Regulations 1996 S.I. 1996/1111
 Road Traffic (Special Parking Area) (London Borough of Newham) (Amendment) Order 1996 S.I. 1996/1112
 A4 Trunk Road (Great West Road, Hounslow) (Prohibition Of Use Of Gap In Central Reserve) Order 1996 S.I. 1996/1113
 Dual-Use and Related Goods (Export Control) (Amendment) Regulations 1996 S.I. 1996/1124
 Fertilisers (Mammalian Meat and Bone Meal) Regulations 1996 S.I. 1996/1125
 Jobseekers Act 1995 (Commencement No.2) Order 1996 S.I. 1996/1126
 Passenger Car Fuel Consumption (Amendment) Order 1996 S.I. 1996/1132
 Social Security Revaluation of Earnings Factors Order 1996 S.I. 1996/1133
 A406 Trunk Road (North Circular Road, Ealing) Red Route (Prescribed Turns No 2) Experimental Traffic Order 1996 S.I. 1996/1134
 A501 Trunk Road (Swinton Street, Camden) (Temporary Prohibition of Traffic) Order 1996 S.I. 1996/1135
 A501 Trunk Road (Camden and Islington) Red Route Experimental Traffic Order 1996 S.I. 1996/1136
 A501 Trunk Road (Camden, Islington and Westminster) Red Route Experimental Traffic Order 1996 S.I. 1996/1137
 Hong Kong (Overseas Public Servants) (Retirement and Compensation) Order 1996 S.I. 1996/1138
 Hong Kong (Overseas Public Servants) (Continuing Service: Compensation) Order 1996 S.I. 1996/1139
 Prevention of Terrorism (Temporary Provisions) Act 1984 (Jersey) (Revocation) Order 1996 S.I. 1996/1140
 Juries (Northern Ireland) Order 1996 S.I. 1996/1141
 Maximum Number of Judges Order 1996 S.I. 1996/1142
 Merchant Shipping (Liability and Compensation for Oil Pollution Damage) (Transitional Provisions) Order 1996 S.I. 1996/1143
 Gaming Clubs (Hours and Charges) (Scotland) Amendment Regulations 1996 S.I. 1996/1144
 Smoke Control Areas (Authorised Fuels) (Amendment) Regulations 1996 S.I. 1996/1145
 Education (Individual Pupils' Achievements) (Information) (Amendment) Regulations 1996 S.I. 1996/1146
 Fresh Meat (Hygiene and Inspection) (Amendment) Regulations 1996 S.I. 1996/1148
 Insurance Brokers Registration Council (Conduct of Investment Business) Rules Approval Order 1996 S.I. 1996/1151
 A501 Trunk Road (Marylebone Road/Nottingham Place, Westminster) (Temporary Prohibition of Traffic) Order 1996 S.I. 1996/1157
 A4 Trunk Road (Hillingdon) Red Route (Clearway) Traffic Order 1996 S.I. 1996/1163
 Plant Health (Great Britain) (Amendment) (No. 2) Order 1996 S.I. 1996/1165
 Beef (Emergency Control) (Amendment) (No. 3) Order 1996 S.I. 1996/1166
 A4 Trunk Road (Hounslow) Red Route (Clearway) Traffic Order 1996 S.I. 1996/1170
 Road Traffic (Permitted Parking Area and Special Parking Area) (County of Hampshire, City of Winchester) Order 1996 S.I. 1996/1171
 Occupational Pension Schemes (Contracting-out) Regulations 1996 S.I. 1996/1172
 Armed Forces Act 1991 (Commencement No.2) Order 1996 S.I. 1996/1173
 Armed Forces (Protection of Children of Service Families) Regulations 1996 S.I. 1996/1174
 London Cab (No. 2) Order 1996 S.I. 1996/1176
 Register of County Court Judgments (Amendment) Regulations 1996 S.I. 1996/1177
 County Council of Northumberland (Duplicate North Seaton Bridge) Scheme 1995 Confirmation Instrument 1996 S.I. 1996/1178
 European Investment Bank (Designated International Organisation) Order 1996 S.I. 1996/1179
 Insurance Companies (Gilt-edged Securities) (Periodic Accounting for Tax on Interest) (Amendment) Regulations 1996 S.I. 1996/1180
 Gilt-edged Securities (Periodic Accounting for Tax on Interest) (Amendment No. 2) Regulations 1996 S.I. 1996/1181
 Lloyd's Underwriters (Gilt-edged Securities) (Periodic Accounting for Tax on Interest) (Amendment No. 2) Regulations 1996 S.I. 1996/1182
 Aberystwyth Harbour Revision Order 1995 S.I. 1996/1183
 Income Tax (Interest Relief) (Amendment) Regulations 1996 S.I. 1996/1184
 Vocational Training (Tax Relief) (Amendment) Regulations 1996 S.I. 1996/1185
 North Hull Housing Action Trust (Transfer of Property) Order 1996 S.I. 1996/1186
 Deregulation (Friendly Societies Act 1992) Order 1996 S.I. 1996/1188
 Deregulation (Credit Unions) Order 1996 S.I. 1996/1189]
 A303 Trunk Road (Sparkford To Ilchester Improvement And Slip Roads) (Detrunking) Order 1996 S.I. 1996/1190
 A303 Trunk Road (Sparkford to Ilchester Improvement and Slip Roads) Order 1996 S.I. 1996/1191
 Specified Bovine Material (No. 2) Order 1996 S.I. 1996/1192
 Bovine Animals (Enforcement of Community Purchase Scheme) Regulations 1996 S.I. 1996/1193
 Offshore Installations (Safety Zones) (No. 3) Order 1996 S.I. 1996/1194
 Value Added Tax (Payments on Account) (Amendment) Order 1996 S.I. 1996/1196
 Financial Services Act 1986 (Gas Industry Exemption) (Amendment) Order 1996 S.I. 1996/1197
 Value Added Tax (Amendment) (No. 2) Regulations 1996 S.I. 1996/1198
 Children's Hearings (Scotland) Amendment Rules 1996 S.I. 1996/1199

1201-1300
 Public Telecommunication System Designation (Torch Communications Limited) Order 1996 S.I. 1996/1203
 Merchant Shipping Act 1995 (Appointed Day No. 1) Order 1996 S.I. 1996/1210
 Deregulation (Salmon Fisheries (Scotland) Act 1868) Order 1996 S.I. 1996/1211
 Food Protection (Emergency Prohibitions) (Oil and Chemical Pollution of Salmon and Migratory Trout) (Revocation) Order 1996 S.I. 1996/1212
 Food Protection (Emergency Prohibitions) (Oil and Chemical Pollution of Fish and Plants (Partial Revocation) Order 1996 S.I. 1996/1213
 Local Government Reorganisation (Wales) (Staff) (No. 3) Order 1996 S.I. 1996/1214
 Local Authorities (Members' Interests) (Amendment) Regulations 1996 S.I. 1996/1215
 Occupational Pension Schemes (Member-nominated Trustees and Directors) Regulations 1996 S.I. 1996/1216
 Housing Benefit and Council Tax Benefit (Subsidy) Order 1996 S.I. 1996/1217
 General Medical Council Preliminary Proceedings Committee and Professional Conduct Committee (Procedure) (Amendment) Rules Order of Council 1996 S.I. 1996/1218
 General Medical Council Health Committee (Procedure) (Amendment) Rules Order of Council 1996 S.I. 1996/1219
 Elections (Northern Ireland) Order 1996 S.I. 1996/1220
 A501 Trunk Road (Euston Road/Gower Street, Camden) (Temporary Prohibition of Traffic) Order 1996 S.I. 1996/1222
 A501 Trunk Road (Marylebone Road/Glentworth Street, Westminster) (Temporary Prohibition of Traffic) Order 1996 S.I. 1996/1223
 National Park Authorities (Wales) (Amendment No. 2) Order 1996 S.I. 1996/1224
 Education (Coleg Normal Bangor Higher Education Corporation) (Dissolution) Order 1996 S.I. 1996/1225
 Income Tax (Unapproved Manufactured Payments) Regulations 1996 S.I. 1996/1226
 Income Tax (Manufactured Interest) (Amendment) Regulations 1996 S.I. 1996/1227
 Income Tax (Stock Lending) (Amendment) Regulations 1996 S.I. 1996/1228
 Income Tax (Manufactured Overseas Dividends) (Amendment) Regulations 1996 S.I. 1996/1229
 A35 Trunk Road (Chideock Morcombelake Bypass) Order 1996 S.I. 1996/1230
 Local Government Reorganisation (Compensation for Redundancy or Loss of Remuneration) (Education) Regulations 1996 S.I. 1996/1240
 Local Government (Superannuation and Compensation for Premature Retirement) (Scotland) Amendment Regulations 1996 S.I. 1996/1241
 Fishing Vessels (Decommissioning) Scheme 1996 S.I. 1996/1242
 National Park Authorities (England) Order 1996 S.I. 1996/1243
 Local Government Act 1988 (Defined Activities) (Exemption) (London Borough of Greenwich) Order 1996 S.I. 1996/1244
 Social Security (Additional Pension) (Contributions Paid in Error) Regulations 1996 S.I. 1996/1245
 Finance Act 1996, section 26, (Appointed Day) Order 1996 S.I. 1996/1249
 Value Added Tax (Amendment) (No. 3) Regulations 1996 S.I. 1996/1250
 Hydrocarbon Oil (Designated Markers) Regulations 1996 S.I. 1996/1251
 Income Support (Pilot Scheme) Regulations 1996 S.I. 1996/1252
 Value Added Tax (Fiscal Warehousing) (Treatment of Transactions) Order 1996 S.I. 1996/1255
 Value Added Tax (Cultural Services) Order 1996 S.I. 1996/1256
 Civil Legal Aid (General) (Amendment) (No. 2) Regulations 1996 S.I. 1996/1257
 Legal Aid in Criminal and Care Proceedings (General) (Amendment) (No. 3) Regulations 1996 S.I. 1996/1258
 Motor Vehicles (Driving Licences) (Amendment) (No. 3) Regulations 1996 S.I. 1996/1259
 Feeding Stuffs (Amendment) Regulations 1996 S.I. 1996/1260
 Medicines (Animal Feeding Stuffs) (Enforcement) (Amendment) Regulations 1996 S.I. 1996/1261
 Town and Country Planning (General Permitted Development) (Scotland) Amendment Order 1996 S.I. 1996/1266
 Churnet Valley Light Railway Order 1996 S.I. 1996/1267
 Charities (Trustee Investments Act 1961) Order 1996 S.I. 1996/1268
 Housing (Change of Landlord) (Payment of Disposal Cost by Instalments) (Amendment No. 2) Regulations 1996 S.I. 1996/1269
 Occupational Pension Schemes (Internal Dispute Resolution Procedures) Regulations 1996 S.I. 1996/1270
 Personal and Occupational Pension Schemes (Pensions Ombudsman) Amendment Regulations 1996 S.I. 1996/1271
 Housing and Planning Act 1986 (Commencement No.19) (Scotland) Order 1996 S.I. 1996/1276
 Waste Management Licensing (Amendment) Regulations 1996 S.I. 1996/1279
 Redundant Mineworkers (Payments Schemes) (Amendment and Consolidation) Order 1996 S.I. 1996/1288
 European Communities (Definition of Treaties) (Partnership and Co-operation Agreement between the European Communities and their Member States and the Republic of Belarus) Order 1996 S.I. 1996/1290
 European Communities (Definition of Treaties) (Partnership and Co-operation Agreement between the European Communities and their Member States and the Republic of Kazakhstan) Order 1996 S.I. 1996/1291
 European Communities (Definition of Treaties) (Partnership and Co-operation Agreement between the European Communities and their Member States and the Kyrgyz Republic) Order 1996 S.I. 1996/1292
 European Communities (Definition of Treaties) (Partnership and Co-operation Agreement between the European Communities and their Member States and the Republic of Moldova) Order 1996 S.I. 1996/1293
 Hong Kong (Overseas Public Servants) (Pension Supplements) Order 1996 S.I. 1996/1294
 International Oil Pollution Compensation Fund 1992 (Immunities and Privileges) Order 1996 S.I. 1996/1295
 United Nations (International Tribunal) (Rwanda) Order 1996 S.I. 1996/1296
 Commissioner for Complaints (Northern Ireland) Order 1996 S.I. 1996/1297
 Ombudsman (Northern Ireland) Order 1996 S.I. 1996/1298
 Proceeds of Crime (Northern Ireland) Order 1996 S.I. 1996/1299
 Misuse of Drugs Act 1971 (Modification) Order 1996 S.I. 1996/1300

1301-1400
 Air Navigation (Amendment) Order 1996 S.I. 1996/1301
 Lotteries (Amendment) Regulations 1996 S.I. 1996/1306
 Jobseeker's Allowance (Pilot Scheme) Regulations 1996 S.I. 1996/1307
 Insolvent Partnerships (Amendment) Order 1996 S.I. 1996/1308
 Fossil Fuel Levy (Amendment) Regulations 1996 S.I. 1996/1309
 Personal Pension Schemes (Tables of Rates of Annuities) Regulations 1996 S.I. 1996/1311
 Income Tax (Employments) (Amendment No. 3) Regulations 1996 S.I. 1996/1312
 National Health Service (Appointment of Consultants) (Wales) Regulations 1996 S.I. 1996/1313
 Housing Benefit and Council Tax Benefit (Subsidy) Amendment Regulations 1996 S.I. 1996/1314
 Severn Bridges Regulations 1996 S.I. 1996/1316
 Food Protection (Emergency Prohibitions) (Oil and Chemical Pollution of Fish and Plants) (Partial Revocation No. 2) Order 1996 S.I. 1996/1319
 Road Traffic Offenders (Northern Ireland) Order 1996 S.I. 1996/1320
 Taxes (Interest Rate) (Amendment No. 2) Regulations 1996 S.I. 1996/1321
 Financial Services Act 1986 (Uncertificated Securities) (Extension of Scope of Act) Order 1996 S.I. 1996/1322
 Capital Allowances Act 1990, section 33A, (Appointed Day) Order 1996 S.I. 1996/1323
 Education (Schools) Act 1992 (Commencement No. 4) Order 1996 S.I. 1996/1325
 Electricity (Restrictive Trade Practices Act 1976) (Exemptions) Order 1996 S.I. 1996/1327
 Housing Renovation etc. Grants (Reduction of Grant) (Amendment) Regulations 1996 S.I. 1996/1331
 Housing Renovation etc. Grants (Prescribed Forms and Particulars) (Amendment) Regulations 1996 S.I. 1996/1332
 Disability Discrimination (Sub-leases and Sub-tenancies) Regulations 1996 S.I. 1996/1333
 Education (Grant-Maintained and Grant-Maintained Special Schools) (Finance) (Wales) (Amendment) Regulations 1996 S.I. 1996/1334
 Statutory Maternity Pay (General) Amendment Regulations 1996 S.I. 1996/1335
 Disability Discrimination Act 1995 (Commencement No.2) Order 1996 S.I. 1996/1336
 Public Lending Right Scheme 1982 (Commencement of Variations) Order 1996 S.I. 1996/1338
 Deregulation (Long Pull) Order 1996 S.I. 1996/1339
 A501 Trunk Road (Marylebone Road/Park Crescent Mews West, Westminster) (Temporary Prohibition of Traffic) Order 1996 S.I. 1996/1340
 Export of Goods (Control) (Amendment) Order 1996 S.I. 1996/1341
 Fertilisers (Sampling and Analysis) Regulations 1996 S.I. 1996/1342
 A501 Trunk Road (Camden and Islington) Red Route (Bus Lanes) Experimental Traffic Order 1996 S.I. 1996/1343
 A501 Trunk Road (Camden) Red Route (Bus Lane) (No. 1.) Experimental Traffic Order 1996 S.I. 1996/1344
 Social Security and Child Support (Jobseeker's Allowance) (Consequential Amendments) Regulations 1996 S.I. 1996/1345
 National Health Service (Travelling Expenses and Remission of Charges) Amendment (No. 2) Regulations 1996 S.I. 1996/1346
 Exchange Gains and Losses (Alternative Method of Calculation of Gain or Loss) (Amendment) Regulations 1996 S.I. 1996/1347
 Exchange Gains and Losses (Deferral of Gains and Losses) (Amendment) Regulations 1996 S.I. 1996/1348
 Exchange Gains and Losses (Transitional Provisions) (Amendment) Regulations 1996 S.I. 1996/1349
 Radioactive Material (Road Transport) (Great Britain) Regulations 1996 S.I. 1996/1350
 Bovine Spongiform Encephalopathy Compensation (Amendment) Order 1996 S.I. 1996/1351
 Brucellosis and Tuberculosis (England and Wales) Compensation (Amendment) Order 1996 S.I. 1996/1352
 Recreational Craft Regulations 1996 S.I. 1996/1353
 Gas Act 1986 (Exemptions) (No. 3) Order 1996 S.I. 1996/1354
 Personal Equity Plan (Amendment No. 2) Regulations 1996 S.I. 1996/1355
 Railways (Closure Provisions) (Exemptions) Order 1996 S.I. 1996/1356
 Brucellosis and Tuberculosis Compensation (Scotland) Amendment Order 1996 S.I. 1996/1358
 Deregulation (Gaming Machines and Betting Office Facilities) Order 1996 S.I. 1996/1359
 Compensation for Redundancy or Premature Retirement (Scottish Environment Protection Agency and River Purification Boards Transitional Arrangements) (Scotland) Regulations 1996 S.I. 1996/1360
 Income Support (General) (Standard Interest Rate Amendment) Regulations 1996 S.I. 1996/1363
 Local Government Reorganisation (Wales) (Capital Finance) (Amendment) Order 1996 S.I. 1996/1366
 Erskine Bridge Tolls Extension Order 1996 S.I. 1996/1370
 Council Tax Limitation (England) (Maximum Amounts) Order 1996 S.I. 1996/1371
 Notification of Existing Substances (Enforcement) (Amendment) Regulations 1996 S.I. 1996/1373
 Prohibition of Keeping of Live Fish (Crayfish) (Amendment) Order 1996 S.I. 1996/1374
 Housing Renovation etc. Grants (Prescribed Forms and Particulars) (Welsh Forms and Particulars) (Amendment) Regulations 1996 S.I. 1996/1378
 Local Statutory Provisions (Exemption of St. Andrews Links Trust) (Scotland) Order 1996 S.I. 1996/1382
 Public Telecommunication System Designation (SWEB Telecoms Limited) Order 1996 S.I. 1996/1384
 Rules of Procedure (Army) (Amendment) Rules 1996 S.I. 1996/1388
 Rules of Procedure (Air Force) (Amendment) Rules 1996 S.I. 1996/1389
 Civil Aviation (Air Travel Organisers' Licensing) (Amendment) Regulations 1996 S.I. 1996/1390
 Local Government Act 1988 (Defined Activities) (Exemption) (Worthing Borough Council) Order 1996 S.I. 1996/1391
 Aerodromes (Designation) (Facilities for Consultation) Order 1996 S.I. 1996/1392
 Rules of the Air Regulations 1996 S.I. 1996/1393

1401-1500
 A61 Trunk Road (B6131 Bar Lane, Mapplewell to Barnsley/Wakefield Metropolitan Boundary) (Detrunking) Order 1996. S.I. 1996/1401
 Pharmaceutical Qualifications (Recognition) Regulations 1996 S.I. 1996/1405
 Pleasure Craft (Arrival and Report) Regulations 1996 S.I. 1996/1406
 Northern Ireland Elections (Returning Officer's Charges) Order 1996 S.I. 1996/1408
 National Disability Council (No. 2) Regulations 1996 S.I. 1996/1410
 Pensions Act 1995 (Commencement No. 4) Order 1996 S.I. 1996/1412
 Family Credit (General) Amendment Regulations 1996 S.I. 1996/1418
 Cromarty Firth Port Authority Harbour Revision Order 1996 S.I. 1996/1419
 Armed Forces (Compensation Limits) Order 1996 S.I. 1996/1420
 Amusement Machine Licence Duty (Small-prize Machines) Order 1996 S.I. 1996/1422
 Amusement Machine Licence Duty (Special Licences) Regulations 1996 S.I. 1996/1423
 Deposits in the Sea (Public Registers of Information) Regulations 1996 S.I. 1996/1427
 Local Government Pension Scheme (Amendment) Regulations 1996 S.I. 1996/1428
 A66 Trunk Road (Stainburn and Great Clifton Bypass) Order 1996 S.I. 1996/1429
 A66 Trunk Road (Stainburn and Great Clifton Bypass) (De-Trunking) Order 1996 S.I. 1996/1430
 Financial Assistance for Environmental Purposes (No.2) Order 1996 S.I. 1996/1431
 Nottingham Healthcare National Health Service Trust (Transfer of Trust Property) Order 1996 S.I. 1996/1432
 Grantham and District Hospital National Health Service Trust (Transfer of Trust Property) Order 1996 S.I. 1996/1433
 Welfare Food Regulations 1996 S.I. 1996/1434
 Personal Pension Schemes (Appropriate Schemes and Disclosure of Information) (Miscellaneous Amendments) Regulations 1996 S.I. 1996/1435
 Social Security (Disability Living Allowance and Claims and Payments) Amendment Regulations 1996 S.I. 1996/1436
 Dolgellau to South of Birkenhead Trunk Road (A494) (Drws y Nant Improvement) Order 1996 S.I. 1996/1437
 Social Fund Maternity and Funeral Expenses (General) Amendment Regulations 1996 S.I. 1996/1443
 Companies (Fees) (Amendment) Regulations 1996 S.I. 1996/1444
 Consumer Credit (Exempt Agreements) (Amendment) Order 1996 1996/1445
 Cosmetic Products (Safety) (Amendment) Regulations 1996 S.I. 1996/1446
 Defence Evaluation and Research Agency Trading Fund (Amendment) Order 1996 S.I. 1996/1447
 National Enterprise Board (Dissolution) Order 1996 S.I. 1996/1448
 Local Government Act 1988 (Defined Activities) (Exemption) (Bromley London Borough Council) Order 1996 S.I. 1996/1449
 Oil and Fibre Plant Seeds (Amendment) Regulations 1996 S.I. 1996/1451
 Vegetable Seeds (Amendment) Regulations 1996 S.I. 1996/1452
 Fodder Plant Seeds (Amendment) Regulations 1996 S.I. 1996/1453
 Home-Grown Cereals Authority (Rate of Levy) Order 1996 S.I. 1996/1454
 Disability Discrimination (Meaning of Disability) Regulations 1996 S.I. 1996/1455
 Disability Discrimination (Employment) Regulations 1996 S.I. 1996/1456
 A10 Trunk Road (Enfield and Haringey) Red Route (Bus Lanes) (No. 1) Traffic Order 1996 S.I. 1996/1459
 Social Security (Claims and Payments) (Jobseeker's Allowance Consequential Amendments) Regulations 1996 S.I. 1996/1460
 Protected Rights (Transfer Payment) Regulations 1996 S.I. 1996/1461
 Contracting-out (Transfer and Transfer Payment) Regulations 1996 S.I. 1996/1462
 A10 Trunk Road (Enfield) Red Route (Bus Lanes) (No. 2) Traffic Order 1996 S.I. 1996/1463
 Wireless Telegraphy (Licence Charges) (Amendment) Regulations 1996 S.I. 1996/1464
 Financial Markets and Insolvency Regulations 1996 S.I. 1996/1469
 Inheritance Tax (Delivery of Accounts) Regulations 1996 S.I. 1996/1470
 Deregulation (Resolutions of Private Companies) Order 1996 S.I. 1996/1471
 Inheritance Tax (Delivery of Accounts) (Scotland) Regulations 1996 S.I. 1996/1472
 Inheritance Tax (Delivery of Accounts) (Northern Ireland) Regulations 1996 S.I. 1996/1473
 Disability Discrimination Act 1995 (Commencement No. 3 and Saving and Transitional Provisions) Order 1996 S.I. 1996/1474
 Inshore Fishing (Prohibition of Fishing and Fishing Methods) (Scotland) Amendment Order 1996 S.I. 1996/1475
 Overseas Service (Pensions Supplement) (Amendment) Regulations 1996 S.I. 1996/1476
 Sweeteners in Food (Amendment) Regulations 1996 S.I. 1996/1477
 Habitat (Former Set-Aside Land) (Amendment) Regulations 1996 S.I. 1996/1478
 Habitat (Salt-Marsh) (Amendment) Regulations 1996 S.I. 1996/1479
 Habitat (Water Fringe) (Amendment) Regulations 1996 S.I. 1996/1480
 Countryside Stewardship (Amendment) (Extension to the Isles of Scilly) Regulations 1996 S.I. 1996/1481
 Arable Area Payments (Amendment) Regulations 1996 S.I. 1996/1482
 Highways (Road Humps) Regulations 1996 S.I. 1996/1483
 Manchester Ship Canal (Bridgewater Canal) Act 1907 (Amendment) Order 1996 S.I. 1996/1484
 Exchange Gains and Losses (Insurance Companies) (Amendment No. 2) Regulations 1996 S.I. 1996/1485
 Seeds (Fees) (Amendment) Regulations 1996 S.I. 1996/1486
 Pesticides (Maximum Residue Levels in Crops, Food and Feeding Stuffs) (Amendment) Regulations 1996 S.I. 1996/1487
 Suckler Cow Premium (Amendment) Regulations 1996 S.I. 1996/1488
 A19 Trunk Road (A19/A64 Fulford Interchange Improvement) Order 1996 S.I. 1996/1491
 Offshore Installations (Safety Zones) (No. 4) Order 1996 S.I. 1996/1492
 European Parliamentary (United Kingdom Representatives) Pensions (Amendment) Order 1996 S.I. 1996/1493
 Civil Aviation Authority (Amendment) Regulations 1996 S.I. 1996/1494
 Civil Aviation (Route Charges for Navigation Services) (Amendment) Regulations 1996 S.I. 1996/1495
 Dental Qualifications (Recognition) Regulations 1996 S.I. 1996/1496
 Food Labelling Regulations 1996 S.I. 1996/1499
 Hill Livestock (Compensatory Allowances) Regulations 1996 S.I. 1996/1500

1501-1600
 Bread and Flour (Amendment) Regulations 1996 S.I. 1996/1501
 Food (Lot Marking) Regulations 1996 S.I. 1996/1502
 National Health Service (Wheelchair Charges) Regulations 1996 S.I. 1996/1503
 National Health Service (General Medical Services, Pharmaceutical Services and Charges for Drugs and Appliances) (Scotland) Amendment Regulations 1996 S.I. 1996/1504
 Medicinal Products: Prescription by Nurses etc. Act 1992 (Commencement No.2) Order 1996 S.I. 1996/1505
 Ancient Monuments (Class Consents) (Scotland) Order 1996 S.I. 1996/1507
 Jobseekers Act 1995 (Commencement No. 3) Order 1996 S.I. 1996/1509
 Housing Benefit, Council Tax Benefit and Supply of Information (Jobseeker's Allowance) (Consequential Amendments) Regulations 1996 S.I. 1996/1510
 Social Security (Back to Work Bonus) (Amendment) Regulations 1996 S.I. 1996/1511
 Fossil Fuel Levy (Scotland) Amendment Regulations 1996 S.I. 1996/1512
 Health and Safety (Consultation with Employees) Regulations 1996 S.I. 1996/1513
 Medicines (Products Other Than Veterinary Drugs) (Prescription Only) Amendment Order 1996 S.I. 1996/1514
 Jobseeker's Allowance (Transitional Provisions) (Amendment) Regulations 1996 S.I. 1996/1515
 Jobseeker's Allowance (Amendment) Regulations 1996 S.I. 1996/1516
 Jobseeker's Allowance and Income Support (General) (Amendment) Regulations 1996 S.I. 1996/1517
 Social Security (Adjudication) Amendment Regulations 1996 S.I. 1996/1518
 Landfill Tax Regulations 1996 S.I. 1996/1527
 Landfill Tax (Qualifying Material) Order 1996 S.I. 1996/1528
 Landfill Tax (Contaminated Land) Order 1996 S.I. 1996/1529
 Criminal Justice and Public Order Act 1994 (Commencement No. 9) Order 1996 S.I. 1996/1530
 Act of Sederunt (Requirements of Writing) 1996 S.I. 1996/1534
 Occupational Pension Schemes (Minimum Funding Requirement and Actuarial Valuations) Regulations 1996 S.I. 1996/1536
 Personal and Occupational Pension Schemes (Protected Rights) Regulations 1996 S.I. 1996/1537
 M11 Motorway (Junction 5, Loughton, Essex, North Facing Slip Roads) Scheme 1996 S.I. 1996/1538
 Food Safety (Fishery Products and Live Bivalve Molluscs and Other Shellfish) (Miscellaneous Amendments) Regulations 1996 S.I. 1996/1547
 Closure of Prisons (H.M. Young Offender Institution Finnamore Wood) Order 1996 S.I. 1996/1551
 Medicines (Advertising) Amendment Regulations 1996 S.I. 1996/1552
 Deregulation (Parking Equipment) Order 1996 S.I. 1996/1553
 Legal Advice and Assistance at Police Stations (Remuneration) (Amendment) (No. 2) Regulations 1996 S.I. 1996/1554
 Legal Aid in Family Proceedings (Remuneration) (Amendment) (No. 2) Regulations 1996 S.I. 1996/1555
 Education (Recognised Awards) (Richmond College) Order 1996 S.I. 1996/1557
 Disclosure of Interests in Shares (Amendment) Regulations 1996 S.I. 1996/1560
 Insider Dealing (Securities and Regulated Markets) (Amendment) Order 1996 S.I. 1996/1561
 Protection of Water Against Agricultural Nitrate Pollution (Scotland) Regulations 1996 S.I. 1996/1564
 Public Telecommunication System Designation (Atlantic Telecommunications Limited) Order 1996 S.I. 1996/1567
 A406 Trunk Road (Hanger Lane, Ealing) (Temporary Prohibition of Traffic) Order 1996 S.I. 1996/1569
 Stock Transfer (Addition and Substitution of Forms) Order 1996 S.I. 1996/1571
 Northern Ireland (Emergency and Prevention of Terrorism Provisions) (Continuance) Order 1996 S.I. 1996/1572
 Deregulation (Gun Barrel Proving) Order 1996 S.I. 1996/1576
 Occupational Pension Schemes (Contracting-out) Amendment Regulations 1996 S.I. 1996/1577
 Local Government Act 1988 (Defined Activities) (Exemption) (Waltham Forest London Borough Council) Order 1996 S.I. 1996/1578
 Local Government Act 1988 (Defined Activities) (Exemption) (London Borough of Bexley) Order 1996 S.I. 1996/1579
 Retirement Benefits Schemes (Restriction on Discretion to Approve) (Excepted Schemes) Regulations 1996 S.I. 1996/1582
 Capital Gains Tax (Pension Funds Pooling Schemes) Regulations 1996 S.I. 1996/1583
 Stamp Duty and Stamp Duty Reserve Tax (Pension Funds Pooling Schemes) Regulations 1996 S.I. 1996/1584
 Income Tax (Pension Funds Pooling Schemes) Regulations 1996 S.I. 1996/1585
 Financial Services Act 1986 (Investment Advertisements) (Exemptions) Order 1996 S.I. 1996/1586
 Financial Services Act 1986 (Exemption) Order 1996 S.I. 1996/1587
 European Primary Medical Qualifications Regulations 1996 S.I. 1996/1591
 Construction (Health, Safety and Welfare) Regulations 1996 S.I. 1996/1592
 Arable Area Payments (Grazing of Bovine Animals on Set-Aside Land) (Temporary Provisions) Regulations 1996 S.I. 1996/1593
 Education (School Performance Information) (England) (Amendment) Regulations 1996 S.I. 1996/1596
 Misuse of Drugs (Amendment) Regulations 1996 S.I. 1996/1597

1601-1700
 Education (Teachers) (Amendment) Regulations 1996 S.I. 1996/1603
 Building Societies (Prescribed Contracts) (Amendment) Order 1996 S.I. 1996/1605
 Building Societies (Supplementary Capital) (Amendment) Order 1996 S.I. 1996/1606
 Aviation Security (Air Cargo Agents) (Amendment) Regulations 1996 S.I. 1996/1607
 Criminal Justice and Public Order Act 1994 (Commencement No. 10) Order 1996 S.I. 1996/1608
 Transport and Works Act 1992 (Commencement No. 6) Order 1996 S.I. 1996/1609
 Yorkshire Regional Flood Defence Committee Order 1996 S.I. 1996/1614
 Wessex Regional Flood Defence Committee Order 1996 S.I. 1996/1615
 Severn-Trent Regional Flood Defence Committee Order 1996 S.I. 1996/1616
 Northumbria Regional Flood Defence Committee Order 1996 S.I. 1996/1617
 Anglian Regional Flood Defence Committee Order 1996 S.I. 1996/1618
 Stansted Airport Aircraft Movement Limit (Amendment) Order 1996 S.I. 1996/1619
 Insurance Companies (Taxation of Reinsurance Business) (Amendment) Regulations 1996 S.I. 1996/1621
 A501 Trunk Road (Euston Road, Camden) (Temporary Prohibition of Traffic) Order 1996 S.I. 1996/1622
 Project Work (Miscellaneous Provisions) Order 1996 S.I. 1996/1623
 A12 Trunk Road (Redbridge) (No. 1) Red Route Traffic Order 1996 S.I. 1996/1624
 A501 Trunk Road (Euston Road, Camden) Red Route (Prescribed Routes) Experimental Traffic Order 1996 S.I. 1996/1625
 Registration of Births, Deaths and Marriages (Amendment) Regulations 1996 S.I. 1996/1626
 Whitehaven Harbour Revision Order 1996 S.I. 1996/1627
 Territorial Sea (Amendment) Order 1996 S.I. 1996/1628
 United Nations Arms Embargoes (Former Yugoslavia) (Amendment) Order 1996 S.I. 1996/1629
 General Medical Council (Constitution) Amendment Order 1996 S.I. 1996/1630
 Medical (Professional Performance) Act 1995 (Commencement No. 2) Order 1996 S.I. 1996/1631
 Deregulation and Contracting Out (Northern Ireland) Order 1996 S.I. 1996/1632
 Food Safety (Amendment) (Northern Ireland) Order 1996 S.I. 1996/1633
 Football Spectators (Corresponding Offences in Norway) Order 1996 S.I. 1996/1634
 Football Spectators (Corresponding Offences in the Republic of Ireland) Order 1996 S.I. 1996/1635
 Health and Personal Social Services (Residual Liabilities) (Northern Ireland) Order 1996 S.I. 1996/1636
 Exempt Charities Order 1996 S.I. 1996/1637
 Naval, Military and Air Forces etc. (Disablement and Death) Service Pensions Amendment (No. 2) Order 1996 S.I. 1996/1638
 European Communities (Definition of Treaties) (The Energy Charter Treaty) Order 1996 S.I. 1996/1639
 Education (Fees and Awards) (Amendment) Regulations 1996 S.I. 1996/1640
 Police (Conduct) (Scotland) Regulations 1996 S.I. 1996/1642
 Police (Efficiency) (Scotland) Regulations 1996 S.I. 1996/1643
 Police Appeals Tribunals (Scotland) Rules 1996 S.I. 1996/1644
 Police (Conduct) (Senior Officers) (Scotland) Regulations 1996 S.I. 1996/1645
 Police and Magistrates' Courts Act 1994 (Commencement No.10 and Savings) (Scotland) Order 1996 S.I. 1996/1646
 Adventure Activities (Enforcing Authority and Licensing Amendment) Regulations 1996 S.I. 1996/1647
 A556(M) Motorway (M6 to M56 Link) and Connecting Roads Scheme 1996 S.I. 1996/1648
 A556(M) Motorway (M6 to M56 Link) Supplementary Connecting Roads Scheme 1996 S.I. 1996/1649
 A556 Trunk Road (Church Farm-Turnpike Wood, Over Tabley) Order 1996 S.I. 1996/1650
 A556 Trunk Road (Turnpike Wood, Over Tabley—A56 Bowdon Roundabout) (Detrunking) Order 1996 S.I. 1996/1651
 Income Tax (Payments on Account) Regulations 1996 S.I. 1996/1654
 Occupational Pension Schemes (Disclosure of Information) Regulations 1996 S.I. 1996/1655
 Work in Compressed Air Regulations 1996 S.I. 1996/1656
 Local Government Act 1988 (Defined Activities) (Exemption) (Gosport Borough Council) Order 1996 S.I. 1996/1657
 Local Government Act 1988 (Defined Activities) (Exemption) (Horsham District Council and Wealden District Council) Order 1996 S.I. 1996/1658
 Value Added Tax (Anti-avoidance (Heating)) Order 1996 S.I. 1996/1661
 Young Offender Institution (Amendment) Rules 1996 S.I. 1996/1662
 Prison (Amendment) Rules 1996 S.I. 1996/1663
 Education (Disability Statements for Further Education Institutions) Regulations 1996 S.I. 1996/1664
 Education (School Performance Information) (Wales) (Amendment) Regulations 1996 S.I. 1996/1665
 Charities (The Royal School for the Blind) Order 1996 S.I. 1996/1667
 Financial Institutions (Prudential Supervision) Regulations 1996 S.I. 1996/1669
 Contracting Out (Functions in relation to the Welfare Food Scheme) Order 1996 S.I. 1996/1670
 Family Proceedings (Amendment) (No. 2) Rules 1996 S.I. 1996/1674
 Pensions Act 1995 (Commencement) (No. 5) Order 1996 S.I. 1996/1675
 Divorce etc. (Pensions) Regulations 1996 S.I. 1996/1676
 Public Telecommunication System Designation (National Transcommunications Limited) Order 1996 S.I. 1996/1677
 Deregulation (Model Appeal Provisions) Order 1996 S.I. 1996/1678
 Occupational Pension Schemes (Indexation)Regulations 1996 S.I. 1996/1679
 Local Government (Discretionary Payments) Regulations 1996 S.I. 1996/1680
 Ayrshire and Arran Community Health Care National Health Service Trust (Establishment) Amendment Order 1996 S.I. 1996/1681
 Deregulation (Improvement of Enforcement Procedures) (Food Safety Act 1990) Order 1996 S.I. 1996/1683
 Runnymede and Spelthorne (Borough Boundaries) Order 1996 S.I. 1996/1684
 Police (Promotion) Regulations 1996 S.I. 1996/1685
 Cattle Passports Order 1996 S.I. 1996/1686
 Local Government Reorganisation (Miscellaneous Provision) (Rush Common) Order 1996 S.I. 1996/1690
 Northern Ireland (Emergency Provisions) Act 1991 (Codes of Practice) (No. 3) Order 1996 S.I. 1996/1698
 Dairy Products (Hygiene) (Amendment) Regulations 1996 S.I. 1996/1699
 Deregulation (Motor Vehicles Tests) Order 1996 S.I. 1996/1700

1701-1800
 Kent and Canterbury Hospitals National Health Service Trust (Transfer of Trust Property) Order 1996 S.I. 1996/1701
 St. Helier National Health Service Trust (Transfer of Trust Property) Order 1996 S.I. 1996/1702
 Wandsworth Community Health National Health Service Trust (Transfer of Trust Property) Order 1996 S.I. 1996/1703
 Heathlands Mental Health National Health Service Trust (Transfer of Trust Property) Order 1996 S.I. 1996/1704
 Football Spectators (Seating) Order 1996 S.I. 1996/1706
 North Downs Community Health National Health Service Trust (Transfer of Trust Property) Order 1996 S.I. 1996/1707
 Royal Surrey County and St. LUke's Hospitals National Health Service Trust (Transfer of Trust Property) Order 1996 S.I. 1996/1708
 Mid Essex Hospital Services National Health Service Trust (Transfer of Trust Property) Order 1996 S.I. 1996/1709
 Merton and Sutton Community National Health Service Trust (Transfer of Trust Property) Order 1996 S.I. 1996/1710
 Mid-Sussex National Health Service Trust (Transfer of Trust Property) Order 1996 S.I. 1996/1711
 Food Protection (Emergency Prohibitions) (Oil and Chemical Pollution of Fish and Plants) (Partial Revocation No. 3) Order 1996 S.I. 1996/1712
 Lewisham Hospital National Health Service Trust (Transfer of Trust Property) Order 1996 S.I. 1996/1713
 Nottingham Community Health National Health Service Trust (Transfer of Trust Property) Order 1996 S.I. 1996/1714
 Occupational Pension Schemes (Scheme Administration) Regulations 1996 S.I. 1996/1715
 Criminal Justice Act 1988(Confiscation Orders) Order 1996 S.I. 1996/1716
 National Savings Bank (Amendment) (No. 2) Regulations 1996 S.I. 1996/1724
 Eggs (Marketing Standards) (Amendment) Regulations 1996 S.I. 1996/1725
 Dual-Use and Related Goods (Export Control) (Amendment No. 2) Regulations 1996 S.I. 1996/1736
 Education (School Inspection) (No. 2) (Amendment) Regulations 1996 S.I. 1996/1737
 Deregulation (Industrial and Provident Societies) Order 1996 S.I. 1996/1738
 North Hampshire Hospitals National Health Service Trust (Transfer of Trust Property) Order 1996 S.I. 1996/1739
 Pathfinder National Health Service Trust (Transfer of Trust Property) Order 1996 S.I. 1996/1740
 Protection of Wrecks (Designation No. 1) Order 1996 S.I. 1996/1741
 Beef (Emergency Control) (Revocation) Order 1996 S.I. 1996/1742
 Fresh Meat (Beef Controls) Regulations 1996 S.I. 1996/1743
 Warwickshire College for Agriculture, Horticulture and Equine Studies (Dissolution) Order 1996 S.I. 1996/1744
 Sex Discrimination (Geoffrey Simpson Bequest Modification) Order 1996 S.I. 1996/1745
 Contracting Out (Administration of Civil Service Pension Schemes) Order 1996 S.I. 1996/1746
 Northern Ireland Act 1974 (Interim Period Extension) Order 1996 S.I. 1996/1748
 Merchant Shipping (Mandatory Ship Reporting) Regulations 1996 S.I. 1996/1749
 Local Government Act 1988 (Defined Activities) (Exemption) (Lambeth London Borough Council) Order 1996 S.I. 1996/1750
 Motor Vehicles (Tests) (Amendment) Regulations 1996 S.I. 1996/1751
 Students' Allowances (Scotland) Regulations 1996 S.I. 1996/1754
 National Health Service Trusts (Membership and Procedure) Amendment Regulations 1996 S.I. 1996/1755
 Act of Sederunt (Rules of the Court of Session Amendment No.3) (Miscellaneous) 1996 S.I. 1996/1756
 Industrial Tribunals (Constitution and Rules of Procedure) (Amendment) Regulations 1996 S.I. 1996/1757
 Industrial Tribunals (Constitution and Rules of Procedure) (Scotland) (Amendment) Regulations 1996 S.I. 1996/1758
 Income-related Benefits Schemes (Miscellaneous Amendments) (No. 2) Regulations 1996 S.I. 1996/1759
 Importation of Animals (Amendment) Order 1996 S.I. 1996/1760
 Winchester School of Art Higher Education Corporation (Dissolution) Order 1996 S.I. 1996/1761
 City of Bristol College (Incorporation) Order 1996 S.I. 1996/1762
 Salford College of Technology Higher Education Corporation (Dissolution) Order 1996 S.I. 1996/1763
 Monkwearmouth College, Sunderland and Wearside College, Sunderland (Dissolution) Order 1996 S.I. 1996/1764
 City of Bristol College (Government) Regulations 1996 S.I. 1996/1765
 Richmond Adult and Community College (Attribution of Surpluses and Deficits) Regulations 1996 S.I. 1996/1766
 Social Security (Disability Living Allowance) Amendment Regulations 1996 S.I. 1996/1767
 Cornwall and Isles of Scilly Learning Disabilities National Health Service Trust (Change of Name) Order 1996 S.I. 1996/1768
 West Lambeth Community Care National Health Service Trust (Change of Name) Order 1996 S.I. 1996/1769
 Radcliffe Infirmary National Health Service Trust (Transfer of Trust Property) Order 1996 S.I. 1996/1770
 Horton General Hospital National Health Service Trust (Transfer of Trust Property) Order 1996 S.I. 1996/1771
 Wireless Telegraphy (Television Licence Fees) (Amendment) (No. 2) Regulations 1996 S.I. 1996/1772
 Oxford Radcliffe Hospital National Health Service Trust (Transfer of Trust Property) Order 1996 S.I. 1996/1773
 Oxfordshire Mental Healthcare National Health Service Trust (Transfer of Trust Property) Order 1996 S.I. 1996/1774
 Oxfordshire Community Health National Health Service Trust (Transfer of Trust Property) Order 1996 S.I. 1996/1775
 Oxfordshire Learning Disability National Health Service Trust (Transfer of Trust Property) Order 1996 S.I. 1996/1776
 Oxfordshire Ambulance National Health Service Trust (Transfer of Trust Property) Order 1996 S.I. 1996/1777
 Family Proceedings (Amendment) (No. 3) Rules 1996 S.I. 1996/1778
 Income Tax (Interest on Quoted Eurobonds) Regulations 1996 S.I. 1996/1779
 Income Tax (Paying and Collecting Agents) Regulations 1996 S.I. 1996/1780
 Double Taxation Relief (Taxes on Income) (United States of America Dividends) (Amendment) Regulations 1996 S.I. 1996/1781
 Double Taxation Relief (Taxes on Income) (Canadian Dividends and Interest) (Amendment) Regulations 1996 S.I. 1996/1782
 Grants for Pre-school Education (Scotland) Regulations 1996 S.I. 1996/1783
 Plant Health Fees (Scotland) Regulations 1996 S.I. 1996/1784
 Private Crossings (Signs and Barriers) Regulations 1996 S.I. 1996/1786
 War Pensions Committees (Amendment) Regulations 1996 S.I. 1996/1790
 A47 Trunk Road (Hardwick Roundabout Flyover and Slip Roads) Order 1996 S.I. 1996/1800

1801-1900
 A47 Trunk Road (Hardwick Roundabout to North Runcton) (Detrunking) Order 1996 S.I. 1996/1801
 Birmingham-Great Yarmouth Trunk Road (King's Lynn Southern Bypass) Order 1971 Partial Revocation Order 1996 S.I. 1996/1802
 Child Benefit, Child Support and Social Security (Miscellaneous Amendments) Regulations 1996 S.I. 1996/1803
 St Mary's Music School (Aided Places) Amendment Regulations 1996 S.I. 1996/1807
 Education (Assisted Places) (Scotland) Amendment Regulations 1996 S.I. 1996/1808
 City of Salford (Pomona Bridge) Scheme 1995 Confirmation Instrument 1996 S.I. 1996/1809
 Plant Breeders' Rights (Applications inDesignated Countries) Order 1996 S.I. 1996/1811
 Education (Student Loans) Regulations 1996 S.I. 1996/1812
 Local Government Act 1988 (Defined Activities) (Exemption) (Kettering Borough Council) Order 1996 S.I. 1996/1813
 Local Authorities (Goods and Services) (Public Bodies) (Trunk Roads) (No. 2) Order 1996 S.I. 1996/1814
 Merchant Shipping (Navigational Warnings)Regulations 1996 S.I. 1996/1815
 Education (School Teachers' Pay and Conditions) (No. 2) Order 1996 S.I. 1996/1816
 Town and Country Planning (General Development Procedure) (Amendment) Order 1996 S.I. 1996/1817
 Manufactured Overseas Dividends (French Indemnity Payments) Regulations 1996 S.I. 1996/1826
 South Tynedale Railway (Light Railway) Order 1996 S.I. 1996/1829
 A1 Motorway (North of Leeming to Scotch Corner Section and Connecting Roads) Scheme 1996 S.I. 1996/1830
 A1 Trunk Road (Lengths of A1 Carriageway between Catterick and Barton) (Detrunking) Order 1996 S.I. 1996/1831
 Education (Funding for Teacher Training) Designation Order 1996 S.I. 1996/1832
 Disability Discrimination (Services and Premises) Regulations 1996 S.I. 1996/1836
 A13 Trunk Road (Tower Hamlets) Red Route (No. 2) Experimental Traffic Order 1996 S.I. 1996/1841
 Nottingham Healthcare National Health Service Trust (Transfer of Trust Property) (No. 2) Order 1996 S.I. 1996/1842
 Pensions Act 1995 (Commencement No.6) Order 1996 S.I. 1996/1843
 Building Societies Act 1986 (Continuance of section 41) Order 1996 S.I. 1996/1844
 A21 Trunk Road (Lamberhurst Bypass) Order 1996 S.I. 1996/1845
 A21 Trunk Road (Lamberhurst Bypass Detrunking) Order 1996 S.I. 1996/1846
 Occupational Pension Schemes (Transfer Values) Regulations 1996 S.I. 1996/1847
 Pensions Act 1995 (Commencement No. 6) Order 1996 S.I. 1996/1853
 National Savings Bank (Investment Deposits) (Limits) (Amendment) Order 1996 S.I. 1996/1854
 Anthrax (Amendment) Order 1996 S.I. 1996/1855
 Jobseeker's Allowance (Pilot Scheme) (Amendment) Regulations 1996 S.I. 1996/1856
 Local Government and Housing Act 1989 (Commencement No. 18) Order 1996 S.I. 1996/1857
 North Tees Health National Health Service Trust (Transfer of Trust Property) Order 1996 S.I. 1996/1858
 Police and Criminal Evidence Act 1984 (Application to Customs and Excise) (Amendment) Order 1996 S.I. 1996/1860
 Offshore Installations (Safety Zones) (No. 5) Order 1996 S.I. 1996/1862
 Cheshire (Boroughs of Halton and Warrington) (Structural Change) Order 1996 S.I. 1996/1863
 Deregulation (Wireless Telegraphy) Order 1996 S.I. 1996/1864
 Devon (City of Plymouth and Borough of Torbay) (Structural Change) Order 1996 S.I. 1996/1865
 Shropshire (District of The Wrekin) (Structural Change) Order 1996 S.I. 1996/1866
 Hereford and Worcester (Structural, Boundary and Electoral Changes) Order 1996 S.I. 1996/1867
 Lancashire (Boroughs of Blackburn and Blackpool) (Structural Change) Order 1996 S.I. 1996/1868
 Essex (Boroughs of Colchester, Southend-on-Sea and Thurrock and District of Tendring) (Structural, Boundary and Electoral Changes) Order 1996 S.I. 1996/1875
 Kent (Borough of Gillingham and City of Rochester upon Medway) (Structural Change) Order 1996 S.I. 1996/1876
 Nottinghamshire (City of Nottingham) (Structural Change) Order 1996 S.I. 1996/1877
 Cambridgeshire (City of Peterborough) (Structural, Boundary and Electoral Changes) Order 1996 S.I. 1996/1878
 Berkshire (Structural Change) Order 1996 S.I. 1996/1879
 Local Authorities (Contracting Out of Tax Billing, Collection and Enforcement Functions) Order 1996 S.I. 1996/1880
 A1 Trunk Road (Islington) Red Route Traffic Order 1993 Variation Order 1996 S.I. 1996/1881
 Local Government Changes For England (Direct Labour and Service Organisations) (Amendment) Regulations 1996 S.I. 1996/1882
 Local Authorities (Contracting Out of Investment Functions) Order 1996 S.I. 1996/1883
 Food Protection (Emergency Prohibitions) (Paralytic Shellfish Poisoning) Order 1996 S.I. 1996/1887
 Local Government Act 1992 (Commencement No. 5) Order 1996 S.I. 1996/1888
 Income Support (General) (Standard Interest Rate Amendment) (No. 2) Regulations 1996 S.I. 1996/1889
 A13 Trunk Road (Tower Hamlets) Red Route Traffic Order 1996 S.I. 1996/1891
 A1400 Trunk Road (Redbridge) Red Route Traffic Order 1996 S.I. 1996/1892
 A12 Trunk Road (Redbridge) Red Route Traffic Order 1996 S.I. 1996/1893
 A13 Trunk Road (Havering) Red Route Traffic Order 1996 S.I. 1996/1894
 A406 Trunk Road (Newham and Barking and Dagenham) Red Route Traffic Order 1996 S.I. 1996/1895
 A13 Trunk Road (Barking and Dagenham) Red Route Traffic Order 1996 S.I. 1996/1896
 Further and Higher Education Act 1992 (Commencement No. 3) Order 1996 S.I. 1996/1897
 Welsh Language Schemes (Public Bodies) Order 1996 S.I. 1996/1898
 Local Government (Publication of Staffing Information) (Wales) Regulations 1996 S.I. 1996/1899
 Scottish Transport Group (Pension Schemes) Order 1996 S.I. 1996/1900

1901-2000
 Divorce etc. (Pensions) (Scotland) Regulations 1996 S.I. 1996/1901
 Deregulation (Building) (Initial Notices and Final Certificates) Order 1996 S.I. 1996/1905
 Building (Approved Inspectors etc.) (Amendment) Regulations 1996 S.I. 1996/1906
 Inshore Fishing (Monofilament Gill Nets) (Scotland) Order 1996 S.I. 1996/1907
 Community Trade Mark Regulations 1996 S.I. 1996/1908
 Insolvent Companies (Reports on Conduct of Directors) Rules 1996 S.I. 1996/1909
 Insolvent Companies (Reports on Conduct of Directors) (Scotland) Rules 1996 S.I. 1996/1910
 Education (Grant-maintained and Grant-maintained Special Schools) (Finance) (Wales) (Amendment) (No. 2) Regulations 1996 S.I. 1996/1911
 European Communities (Designation) (No. 2) Order 1996 S.I. 1996/1912
 Ministerial and other Salaries Order 1996 S.I. 1996/1913
 Parliamentary Commissioner Order 1996 S.I. 1996/1914
 Consular Fees Order 1996 S.I. 1996/1915
 Outer Space Act 1986 (Gibraltar) Order 1996 S.I. 1996/1916
 Appropriation (No. 2) (Northern Ireland) Order 1996 S.I. 1996/1917
 Education (Student Loans) (Northern Ireland) Order 1996 S.I. 1996/1918
 Employment Rights (Northern Ireland) Order 1996 S.I. 1996/1919
 Explosives (Amendment) (Northern Ireland) Order 1996 S.I. 1996/1920
 Industrial Tribunals (Northern Ireland) Order 1996 S.I. 1996/1921
 Parliamentary Constituencies (England) (Miscellaneous Changes) Order 1996 S.I. 1996/1922
 Personal Social Services (Direct Payments) (Northern Ireland) Order 1996 S.I. 1996/1923
 Maximum Number of Stipendiary Magistrates Order 1996 S.I. 1996/1924
 Recovery Abroad of Maintenance (Convention Countries) Order 1996 S.I. 1996/1925
 European Parliamentary Constituencies (Scotland) Order 1996 S.I. 1996/1926
 Social Security (Malta) Order 1996 S.I. 1996/1927
 Social Security (Reciprocal Agreements) Order 1996 S.I. 1996/1928
 Motor Vehicles (International Circulation) (Amendment) Order 1996 S.I. 1996/1929
 Local Authorities (Armorial Bearings) (No. 2) (Wales) Order 1996 S.I. 1996/1930
 European Communities (Definition of Treaties) (Euro-Mediterranean Agreement Establishing an Association between the European Communities and their Member States and the Republic of Tunisia) Order 1996 S.I. 1996/1931
 Exempt Charities (No. 2) Order 1996 S.I. 1996/1932
 Exempt Charities (No. 3) Order 1996 S.I. 1996/1933
 Education (School Inspection) (Wales) (No. 2) (Amendment) Regulations 1996 S.I. 1996/1934
 Education (Reorganisation in Inner London) (Compensation) (Amendment and Modification) Regulations 1996 S.I. 1996/1935
 Education (School Information) (Wales) (Amendment) Regulations 1996 S.I. 1996/1936
 A449 and A456 Trunk Roads (Kidderminster, Blakedown and Hagley Bypass and Slip Roads) Order 1996 S.I. 1996/1937
 Community Service by Offenders (Hours of Work) (Scotland) Order 1996 S.I. 1996/1938
 Sheep Annual Premium and Suckler Cow Premium Quotas (Amendment) Regulations 1996 S.I. 1996/1939
 Plant Protection Products (Amendment) Regulations 1996 S.I. 1996/1940
 Specified Bovine Material (No. 3) Order 1996 S.I. 1996/1941
 Trade Marks (Fees) Rules 1996 S.I. 1996/1942
 Transport Act 1982 (Commencement No. 7 and Transitional Provisions) Order 1996 S.I. 1996/1943
 Income-related Benefits Schemes and Social Fund (Miscellaneous Amendments) Regulations 1996 S.I. 1996/1944
 Child Support (Miscellaneous Amendments) Regulations 1996 S.I. 1996/1945
 Harbour Works (Assessment of Environmental Effects) (Amendment) Regulations 1996 S.I. 1996/1946
 Food Protection (Emergency Prohibitions) (Oil and Chemical Pollution of Fish and Plants) (Partial Revocation No. 4) Order 1996 S.I. 1996/1957
 County Council of Norfolk (Reconstruction of Stow Bridge) Scheme 1995 Confirmation Instrument 1996 S.I. 1996/1960
 Department of Transport (Fees) (Amendment) Order 1996 S.I. 1996/1961
 Environmentally Sensitive Areas (Machair of the Uists and Benbecula, Barra and Vatersay) Designation (Amendment) Order 1996 S.I. 1996/1962
 Environmentally Sensitive Areas (Cairngorms Straths) Designation (Amendment) Order 1996 S.I. 1996/1963
 Environmentally Sensitive Areas (Central Borders) Designation (Amendment) Order 1996 S.I. 1996/1964
 Environmentally Sensitive Areas (Shetland Islands) Designation (Amendment) Order 1996 S.I. 1996/1965
 Environmentally Sensitive Areas (Argyll Islands) Designation (Amendment) Order 1996 S.I. 1996/1966
 Environmentally Sensitive Areas (Stewartry) Designation (Amendment) Order 1996 S.I. 1996/1967
 Environmentally Sensitive Areas (Western Southern Uplands) Designation (Amendment) Order 1996 S.I. 1996/1968
 Environmentally Sensitive Areas (Central Southern Uplands) Designation (Amendment) Order 1996 S.I. 1996/1969
 Scottish Examination Board (Amendment No.2) Regulations 1996 S.I. 1996/1970
 Colleges of Education (Local Government Re-organisation Consequential Provisions) (Scotland) Order 1996 S.I. 1996/1971
 Driving Licences (Community Driving Licence) Regulations 1996 S.I. 1996/1974
 Occupational Pension Schemes (Requirement to obtain Audited Accounts and a Statement from the Auditor) Regulations 1996 S.I. 1996/1975
 Occupational Pension Schemes (Pensions Compensation Board Limit on Borrowing) Regulations 1996 S.I. 1996/1976
 Occupational Pension Schemes (Mixed Benefit Contracted-out Schemes) Regulations 1996 S.I. 1996/1977
 Local Authorities (Charges for Overseas Assistance and Public Path Orders) Regulations 1996 S.I. 1996/1978
 Pneumoconiosis etc. (Workers' Compensation) (Payment of Claims) Amendment Regulations 1996 S.I. 1996/1979
 Road Traffic (Driving Instruction by Disabled Persons) Act 1993 (Commencement) Order 1996 S.I. 1996/1980
 Tyne Riverside Enterprise Zones (North Tyneside) (Designation) (No. 2) Order 1996 S.I. 1996/1981
 Housing Accommodation and Homelessness (Persons subject to Immigration Control) Order 1996 S.I. 1996/1982
 Motor Cars (Driving Instruction) (Amendment) Regulations 1996 S.I. 1996/1983
 Parochial Fees Order 1996 S.I. 1996/1994
 Chessington Computer Centre Trading Fund (Revocation) Order 1996 S.I. 1996/1995
 Disability Discrimination (Guidance and Code Of Practice) (Appointed Day) Order 1996 S.I. 1996/1996
 Motor Vehicles (Driving Licences) (Amendment) (No. 4) Regulations 1996 S.I. 1996/1997

2001-2100
 Mines (Substances Hazardous to Health) Regulations 1996 S.I. 1996/2001
 Beef (Marketing Payment) Regulations 1996 S.I. 1996/2005
 Income-related Benefits (Montserrat) Regulations 1996 S.I. 1996/2006
 Bovine Spongiform Encephalopathy Order 1996 S.I. 1996/2007
 Vehicle Excise Duty (Fee for Temporary Licences) Regulations 1996 S.I. 1996/2008
 Local Government Changes for England (Sheriffs) Order 1996 S.I. 1996/2009
 Road Traffic (Permitted Parking Area and Special Parking Area) (County of Hampshire, City of Winchester) (Amendment) Order 1996 S.I. 1996/2017
 Special Waste (Amendment) Regulations 1996 S.I. 1996/2019
 Nursery Education and Grant-Maintained Schools Act 1996 (Commencement No. 1) Order 1996 S.I. 1996/2022
 Salford Royal Hospitals National Health Service Trust (Transfer of Trust Property) Order 1996 S.I. 1996/2032
 Manchester Children's Hospitals National Health Service Trust (Transfer of Trust Property) Order 1996 S.I. 1996/2033
 Grimsby Health National Health Service Trust(Change of Name) Order 1996 S.I. 1996/2034
 Education (Assisted Places) (Incidental Expenses) (Amendment) Regulations 1996 S.I. 1996/2035
 Education (Grants) (Music, Ballet and Choir Schools) (Amendment) Regulations 1996 S.I. 1996/2036
 Harwich Parkeston Quay Harbour Revision Order 1996 S.I. 1996/2037
 Control of Pollution (Silage, Slurry and Agricultural Fuel Oil) (Amendment) Regulations 1996 S.I. 1996/2044
 Postal Privilege (Suspension) Order 1996 S.I. 1996/2045
 Dartford-Thurrock Crossing Tolls Order 1996 S.I. 1996/2046
 Dartford-Thurrock Crossing (Amendment) Regulations 1996 S.I. 1996/2047
 Housing Act 1996 (Commencement No. 1) Order 1996 S.I. 1996/2048
 Education (Grant-maintained Schools) (Initial Governing Instruments) (Amendment) Regulations 1996 S.I. 1996/2049
 Education (School Government) (Amendment) Regulations 1996 S.I. 1996/2050
 National Health Service (General Dental Services) Amendment (No. 2) Regulations 1996 S.I. 1996/2051
 Registration of Births, Deaths and Marriages (Accounting) Amendment Regulations 1996 S.I. 1996/2052
 Asylum and Immigration Act 1996 ( Commencement No. 1) Order 1996 S.I. 1996/2053
 Chemical Weapons Act 1996 (Commencement) Order 1996 S.I. 1996/2054
 National Health Service (General Dental Services) (Scotland) Amendment (No.2) Regulations 1996 S.I. 1996/2060
 Road Vehicles (Construction and Use) (Amendment) (No. 3) Regulations 1996 S.I. 1996/2064
 Immigration (Transit Visa) (Amendment) Order 1996 S.I. 1996/2065
 Local Government Act 1988 (Defined Activities) (Exemptions) (Bedford Borough Council and Suffolk Coastal District Council) Order 1996 S.I. 1996/2068
 National Health Service (Functions of Health Authorities in England) (General Dental Services Incentive Schemes) Regulations 1996 S.I. 1996/2069
 Asylum Appeals (Procedure) Rules 1996 S.I. 1996/2070
 Offensive Weapons Act 1996 (Commencement No. 1) Order 1996 S.I. 1996/2071
 Health and Safety at Work etc. Act 1974 (Application to Environmentally Hazardous Substances) Regulations 1996 S.I. 1996/2075
 Education (London Residuary Body) (Property Transfer) (Amendment) Order 1996 S.I. 1996/2082
 Education (National Curriculum) (Exceptions) Regulations 1996 S.I. 1996/2083
 Brunel College of Arts and Technology and South Bristol College (Dissolution) Order 1996 S.I. 1996/2084
 Road Vehicles (Construction And Use) (Amendment) (No. 4) Regulations 1996 S.I. 1996/2085
 Nursery Education Regulations 1996 S.I. 1996/2086
 Education (Pupil Referral Units) (Application of Enactments) (Amendment) Regulations 1996 S.I. 1996/2087
 Education (Mandatory Awards) (Amendment)Regulations 1996 S.I. 1996/2088
 Carriage of Dangerous Goods by Rail Regulations 1996 S.I. 1996/2089
 Packaging, Labelling and Carriage of Radioactive Material by Rail Regulations 1996 S.I. 1996/2090
 Fire Services (Appointments and Promotion) (Scotland) Amendment Regulations 1996 S.I. 1996/2091
 Carriage of Dangerous Goods (Classification, Packaging and Labelling) and Use of Transportable Pressure Receptacles Regulations 1996 S.I. 1996/2092
 Carriage of Explosives by Road Regulations 1996 S.I. 1996/2093
 Carriage of Dangerous Goods by Road (Driver Training) Regulations 1996 S.I. 1996/2094
 Carriage of Dangerous Goods by Road Regulations 1996 S.I. 1996/2095
 Fire Services (Appointments and Promotion) (Amendment) Regulations 1996 S.I. 1996/2096
 Fresh Meat (Beef Controls) (No. 2) Regulations 1996 S.I. 1996/2097
 Value Added Tax (Amendment) (No. 4) Regulations 1996 S.I. 1996/2098
 Insurance Premium Tax (Amendment) Regulations 1996 S.I. 1996/2099
 Landfill Tax (Amendment) Regulations 1996 S.I. 1996/2100

2101-2200
 AEA Technology plc (Capital Allowances) Order 1996 S.I. 1996/2101
 Deregulation (Insurance Companies Act 1982) Order 1996 S.I. 1996/2102
 Ilfracombe Harbour Revision Order 1996 S.I. 1996/2103
 Environmentally Sensitive Areas (Upper Thames Tributaries) Designation (Amendment) Order 1996 S.I. 1996/2105
 Environmentally Sensitive Areas (Blackdown Hills) Designation (Amendment) Order 1996 S.I. 1996/2106
 Environmentally Sensitive Areas (Cotswold Hills) Designation (Amendment) Order 1996 S.I. 1996/2107
 Environmentally Sensitive Areas (Essex Coast) Designation (Amendment) Order 1996 S.I. 1996/2108
 Environmentally Sensitive Areas (Shropshire Hills) Designation (Amendment) Order 1996 S.I. 1996/2109
 Environmentally Sensitive Areas (Dartmoor) Designation (Amendment) Order 1996 S.I. 1996/2110
 Education (Assisted Places) (Amendment) Regulations 1996 S.I. 1996/2113
 Education (National Curriculum) (Assessment Arrangements for the Core Subjects) (Key Stage 1) (England) (Amendment) Order 1996 S.I. 1996/2114
 Education (National Curriculum) (Assessment Arrangements for the Core Subjects) (Key Stage 2) (England) (Amendment) Order 1996 S.I. 1996/2115
 Education (National Curriculum) (Key Stage 3 Assessment Arrangements) (England) Order 1996 S.I. 1996/2116
 Broadcasting Act 1996 (Commencement No. 1 and Transitional Provisions) Order 1996 S.I. 1996/2120
 Local Authorities (Capital Finance) (Amendment No. 2) Regulations 1996 S.I. 1996/2121
 General Medical Council (Constitution of Fitness to Practise Committees) Rules Order of Council 1996 S.I. 1996/2125
 Closure of Prisons (H.M. Prison Oxford) Order 1996 S.I. 1996/2126
 Asylum and Immigration Act 1996 (Commencement No. 2) Order 1996 S.I. 1996/2127
 Merchant Shipping (Prevention of Pollution) (Limits) Regulations 1996 S.I. 1996/2128
 M62 (East) To M606 Link And Connecting Roads Scheme 1996 S.I. 1996/2130
 Personal and Occupational Pension Schemes (Preservation of Benefit and Perpetuities) (Amendments) Regulations 1996 S.I. 1996/2131
 Guarantee Payments (Exemption) (No. 30) Order 1996 S.I. 1996/2132
 Chester–Bangor Trunk Road (A55) (Pont Dafydd to Waen Improvement, Detrunking) Order 1996 S.I. 1996/2142
 Immigration (Restricted Right of Appeal Against Deportation) (Exemption) (Amendment) Order 1996 S.I. 1996/2145
 Police Act 1996 (Scotland) Order 1996 S.I. 1996/2146
 Act of Adjournal (Criminal Procedure Rules Amendment) (Miscellaneous) 1996 S.I. 1996/2147
 Act of Sederunt (Civil Legal Aid Rules) (Amendment) 1996 S.I. 1996/2148
 Act of Sederunt (Mental Health Rules) 1996 S.I. 1996/2149
 Pensions Act 1995 (Commencement No. 6 : S.I. 1996/1853 : C.38) (Amendment) Order 1996 S.I. 1996/2150
 Merchant Shipping (Prevention of Oil Pollution) Regulations 1996 S.I. 1996/2154
 A501 Trunk Road (Camden and Westminster) Red Route Experimental Traffic Order 1996 S.I. 1996/2155
 Occupational Pension Schemes (Payments to Employers) Regulations 1996 S.I. 1996/2156
 A4 Trunk Road (Hillingdon) (Prescribed Routes) Order 1996 S.I. 1996/2157
 M66 Motorway (Bury Easterly Bypass Northern Section) (Junction 2 Southbound Off-Slip) (Detrunking) Order 1996 S.I. 1996/2158
 M66 Motorway (Bury Easterly Bypass Northern Section) And Connecting Roads Scheme 1973 (Variation) Scheme 1996 S.I. 1996/2159
 A501 Trunk Road (Marylebone Road/Upper Harley Street, Westminster) (Temporary Prohibition of Turns) Traffic Order 1996 S.I. 1996/2162
 Agricultural Holdings (Units of Production) Order 1996 S.I. 1996/2163
 A205 Trunk Road (Richmond and Wandsworth) Red Route Traffic Order 1996 S.I. 1996/2164
 A41 Trunk Road (Camden and Westminster) Red Route (Bus Lanes) Experimental Traffic Order 1996 S.I. 1996/2165
 A41 Trunk Road (Westminster) Red Route Experimental Traffic Order 1996 S.I. 1996/2166
 Act of Sederunt (Family Proceedings in the Sheriff Court) 1996 S.I. 1996/2167
 Act of Sederunt (Rules of the Court of Session Amendment No. 4) (Miscellaneous) 1996 S.I. 1996/2168
 Local Government Changes for England (Collection Fund Surpluses and Deficits) (Amendment) Regulations 1996 S.I. 1996/2177
 Local Government Pension Scheme (Crown Prosecution Service) (Transfer of Pension Rights) Regulations 1996 S.I. 1996/2180
 County Court (Amendment) Rules 1996 S.I. 1996/2181
 Contracting Out of Functions (Court Staff) Order 1996 S.I. 1996/2182
 Act of Sederunt (Chancery Procedure Rules) 1996 S.I. 1996/2184
 Advanced Television Services (Industrial Property Rights) Regulations 1996 S.I. 1996/2185
 Goods Vehicles (Licensing of Operators) (Temporary Use in Great Britain) Regulations 1996 S.I. 1996/2186
 Sheriff Court Districts (Alteration of Boundaries) Amendment Order 1996 S.I. 1996/2192
 Animal Test Certificates Regulations 1996 S.I. 1996/2194
 Medicines (Exemptions from Licences)(Revocation) Order 1996 S.I. 1996/2195
 Medicines (Products for Animal Use — Fees) (Amendment) Regulations 1996 S.I. 1996/2196
 Medicines (Exemptions from Animal Test Certificates) (Revocation) Order 1996 S.I. 1996/2197
 Assured and Protected Tenancies (Lettings to Students) (Amendment) (No. 2) Regulations 1996 S.I. 1996/2198
 EC Competition Law (Articles 88 and 89) Enforcement Regulations 1996 S.I. 1996/2199

2201-2300
 City of Manchester (Mancunian Way A57(M)) (Chester Road Roundabout) Motorway Scheme 1995 Confirmation Instrument 1996 S.I. 1996/2201
 Spring Traps Approval (Scotland) Order 1996 S.I. 1996/2202
 Children (Scotland) Act 1995 (Commencement No.2 and Transitional Provisions) Order 1996 S.I. 1996/2203
 Jobseekers Act 1995 (Commencement No. 4) Order 1996 S.I. 1996/2208
 Housing Act 1996 (Commencement No. 2 and Savings) Order 1996 S.I. 1996/2212
 Noise Act 1996 (Commencement No. 1) Order 1996 S.I. 1996/2219
 Housing (Change of Landlord) (Payment of Disposal Cost by Instalments) (Amendment No. 3) Regulations 1996 S.I. 1996/2228
 Deregulation (Slaughterhouses Act 1974 and Slaughter of Animals (Scotland) Act 1980) Order 1996 S.I. 1996/2235
 Education (Transfer of Functions Relating to Grant-maintained Schools) Order 1996 S.I. 1996/2247
 Scottish Qualifications Authority (Establishment) (Scotland) Order 1996 S.I. 1996/2248
 Scottish Qualifications Authority (Transitional Provisions) (Scotland) Order 1996 S.I. 1996/2249
 Education (Scotland) Act 1996 (Commencement) Order 1996 S.I. 1996/2250
 Building Standards (Scotland) Amendment Regulations 1996 S.I. 1996/2251
 Cattle Passports (Fees) Order 1996 S.I. 1996/2255
 Social Landlords (Permissible Additional Purposes or Objects) Order 1996 S.I. 1996/2256
 Education (National Curriculum) (Exceptions) (Wales) (Revocation) Regulations 1996 S.I. 1996/2259
 Bridgend and District National Health Service Trust (Transfer of Trust Property) Order 1996 S.I. 1996/2260
 North Glamorgan National Health Service Trust (Transfer of Trust Property) Order 1996 S.I. 1996/2261
 Sexual Offences (Conspiracy and Incitement) Act 1996 (Commencement) Order 1996 S.I. 1996/2262
 Special Trustees for the Middlesex Hospital(Transfer of Trust Property) Order 1996 S.I. 1996/2263
 Heads of Sheep and Goats Order 1996 S.I. 1996/2264
 Bovine Products (Despatch to other Member States) Regulations 1996 S.I. 1996/2265
 Teachers' Superannuation (Amendment) Regulations 1996 S.I. 1996/2269
 Local Government (Access to Information) (Scotland) Order 1996 S.I. 1996/2278
 Teachers' Superannuation (Provision of Information and Administrative Expenses etc.) Regulations 1996 S.I. 1996/2282
 Channel Tunnel (International Arrangements) (Amendment) Order 1996 S.I. 1996/2283
 Road Traffic (Special Parking Area) (City of Westminster) (Amendment) Order 1996 S.I. 1996/2284
 National Health Service (Transitional Functions of Health Authorities) (Administra tion Arrangements) Regulations 1996 S.I. 1996/2285
 Cider and Perry (Amendment) Regulations 1996 S.I. 1996/2287
 South and East Wales Ambulance National Health Service Trust (Establishment) (Amendment) Order 1996 S.I. 1996/2288
 Contracting Out (Functions relating to Wireless Telegraphy) Order 1996 S.I. 1996/2290
 Plant Health (Fees) (Forestry) (Great Britain) Regulations 1996 S.I. 1996/2291

2301-2400
 Education (Grant-maintained Special Schools) (Amendment) (No. 2) Regulations 1996 S.I. 1996/2303
 Offshore Installations (Safety Zones) (No. 6) Order 1996 S.I. 1996/2304
 Rent Assessment Committee (England and Wales) (Leasehold Valuation Tribunal) (Amendment) Regulations 1996 S.I. 1996/2305
 Social Security (Claims and Payments and Adjudication) Amendment Regulations 1996 S.I. 1996/2306
 Legal Aid in Criminal and Care Proceedings (General) (Amendment) (No. 4) Regulations 1996 S.I. 1996/2307
 Legal Advice and Assistance (Amendment) (No. 3) Regulations 1996 S.I. 1996/2308
 Civil Legal Aid (Assessment of Resources)(Amendment) (No. 3) Regulations 1996 S.I. 1996/2309
 Health Authorities Act 1995 (Transitional Provisions) Amendment Order 1996 S.I. 1996/2310
 Hydrocarbon Oil (Payment of Rebates) Regulations 1996 S.I. 1996/2313
 Finance Act 1996, section 5(6), (Appointed Day)Order 1996 S.I. 1996/2314
 Finance Act 1994, sections 244 and 245, (Commencement) Order 1996 S.I. 1996/2316
 Teachers (Compensation for Premature Retirement and Redundancy) (Scotland) Regulations 1996 S.I. 1996/2317
 National Health Service (General Ophthalmic Services) Amendment (No. 2) Regulations 1996 S.I. 1996/2320
 Housing Act 1996 (Consequential Provisions) Order 1996 S.I. 1996/2325
 Housing Benefit (Permitted Totals) (Amendment) Order 1996 S.I. 1996/2326
 Child Benefit (General) Amendment Regulations 1996 S.I. 1996/2327
 National Health Service (Optical Charges and Payments) Amendment (No. 2) Regulations 1996 S.I. 1996/2328
 Road Vehicles (Construction and Use) (Amendment) (No. 5) Regulations 1996 S.I. 1996/2329
 Motor Vehicles (Type Approval) (Great Britain) (Amendment) Regulations 1996 S.I. 1996/2330
 Motor Vehicles (Type Approval for Goods Vehicles) (Amendment) Regulations 1996 S.I. 1996/2331
 A3 Trunk Road (Kingston upon Thames) Red Route Traffic Order 1996 S.I. 1996/2332
 A3 Trunk Road (Merton) Red Route (Clearway) Traffic Order 1996 S.I. 1996/2333
 A3 Trunk Road (Merton) Red Route Traffic Order 1996 S.I. 1996/2334
 A205 Trunk Road (Hounslow) Red Route (Bus Lanes) Experimental Traffic Order 1996 S.I. 1996/2335
 A205 Trunk Road (Hounslow) Red Route Traffic Order 1996 S.I. 1996/2336
 Education (National Curriculum) (Key Stage 3 Assessment Arrangements) (Wales) Order 1996 S.I. 1996/2337
 A3 Trunk Road (Wandsworth) Red Route (Clearway) Traffic Order 1996 S.I. 1996/2338
 A3 Trunk Road (Kingston upon Thames) Red Route (Clearway) Traffic Order 1996 S.I. 1996/2339
 Criminal Procedure and Investigations Act 1996 (Appointed Day No. 1) Order 1996 S.I. 1996/2343
 Social Security (Jobseeker's Allowance Consequential Amendments) (Deductions) Regulations 1996 S.I. 1996/2344
 Stamp Duty (Production of Documents) (Northern Ireland) Regulations 1996 S.I. 1996/2348
 Employment Protection (Recoupment of Jobseeker's Allowance and Income Support) Regulations 1996 S.I. 1996/2349
 Housing Grants, Construction and Regeneration Act 1996 (Commencement No. 1) Order 1996 S.I. 1996/2352
 National Health Service (General Ophthalmic Services) Amendment (No.2) Regulations 1996 S.I. 1996/2353
 National Health Service (Optical Charges and Payments) (Scotland) Amendment (No.2) Regulations 1996 S.I. 1996/2354
 Food Protection (Emergency Prohibitions) (Oil and Chemical Pollution of Fish and Plants) (Partial Revocation No. 5) Order 1996 S.I. 1996/2355
 Community Health Services, Southern Derbyshire National Health Service Trust (Transfer of Trust Property) Order 1996 S.I. 1996/2359
 Solihull Health Authority (Transfer of Trust Property) Order 1996 S.I. 1996/2360
 National Health Service (Travelling Expenses and Remission of Charges) Amendment (No. 3) Regulations 1996 S.I. 1996/2362
 Social Security (Credits and Contributions) (Jobseeker's Allowance Consequential and Miscellaneous Amendments) Regulations 1996 S.I. 1996/2367
 Tenants' Rights of First Refusal (Amendment)Regulations 1996 S.I. 1996/2371
 European Communities (Recognition of Professional Qualifications) (Second General System) Regulations 1996 S.I. 1996/2374
 Social Security and Child Support (Jobseeker's Allowance) (Transitional Provisions) (Amendment) Regulations 1996 S.I. 1996/2378
 Income Tax (Employments) (Amendment No. 4) Regulations 1996 S.I. 1996/2381
 Town and Country Planning (Costs of Inquiries etc.) (Examination in Public) Regulations 1996 S.I. 1996/2382
 North Hampshire, Loddon Community National Health Service Trust (Transfer of Trust Property) Order 1996 S.I. 1996/2384
 Teddington Memorial Hospital National Health Service Trust (Transfer of Trust Property) Order 1996 S.I. 1996/2385
 A1400 Trunk Road (Southend Road, Redbridge) (Prohibition of Right Turn and U-Turns) Order 1996 S.I. 1996/2387
 National Health Service (Travelling Expenses and Remission of Charges) (Scotland) Amendment (No.2) Regulations 1996 S.I. 1996/2391
 Moorland (Livestock Extensification) (Amendment) Regulations 1996 S.I. 1996/2393
 Rural Development Grants (Agriculture) (Amendment) Regulations 1996 S.I. 1996/2394
 Deregulation (Still-Birth and Death Registration) Order 1996 S.I. 1996/2395
 Taxation of Benefits under Pilot Schemes (Earnings Top-up) Order 1996 S.I. 1996/2396

2401-2500
 Housing Act 1996 (Commencement No. 3 and Transitional Provisions) Order 1996 S.I. 1996/2402
 Cornwall (Coroners' Districts) (Amendment) Order 1996 S.I. 1996/2403
 Community Charge and Council Tax (Administration and Enforcement) (Amendment) (Jobseeker's Allowance) Regulations 1996 S.I. 1996/2405
 Parliamentary Pensions (Amendment) Regulations 1996 S.I. 1996/2406
 Social Security (Contributions) Amendment (No. 5) Regulations 1996 S.I. 1996/2407
 Local Government Act 1988 (Defined Activities) (Exemption) (London Borough of Brent) Order 1996 S.I. 1996/2417
 Merchant Shipping (Survey and Certification) (Amendment) Regulations 1996 S.I. 1996/2418
 Fishing Vessels (Safety Provisions) (Amendment) Rules 1996 S.I. 1996/2419
 Medicines (Data Sheet) Amendment Regulations 1996 S.I. 1996/2420
 Aerosol Dispensers (EEC Requirements)(Amendment) Regulations 1996 S.I. 1996/2421
 National Health Service Pension Scheme (Provision of Information and Administrative Expenses etc.) Regulations 1996 S.I. 1996/2424
 Income Support and Social Security (Claims and Payments) (Miscellaneous Amendments) Regulations 1996 S.I. 1996/2431
 Council Tax Benefit and Housing Benefit (Miscellaneous Amendments) Regulations 1996 S.I. 1996/2432
 Sea Fishing (Enforcement of Community Quota Measures) (Amendment) Order 1996 S.I. 1996/2433
 Tyne Riverside Enterprise Zones (North Tyneside and South Tyneside) (Designation) Order 1996 S.I. 1996/2435
 Civil Legal Aid (Scotland) Regulations 1996 S.I. 1996/2444
 Act of Sederunt (Sheriff Court Ordinary Cause Rules Amendment) (Miscellaneous) 1996 S.I. 1996/2445
 Act of Sederunt (Proceeds of Crime Rules) 1996 S.I. 1996/2446
 Advice and Assistance (Scotland) (Consolidation and Amendment) Regulations 1996 S.I. 1996/2447
 A1 (Old Craighall Roundabout to East of Haddington) Special Road Regulations 1996 S.I. 1996/2448
 Moorland (Livestock Extensification) (Wales) (Amendment) Regulations 1996 S.I. 1996/2449
 Social Security (Adjudication) and Child Support Amendment (No. 2) Regulations 1996 S.I. 1996/2450
 Security Service Act 1996 (Commencement) Order 1996 S.I. 1996/2454
 Bovine Spongiform Encephalopathy (Amendment) Order 1996 S.I. 1996/2458
 Optimum Health Services National Health Service Trust (Transfer of Trust Property) Order 1996 S.I. 1996/2462
 Plymouth Community Services National Health Service Trust (Transfer of Trust Property) Order 1996 S.I. 1996/2463
 Dairy Products (Hygiene) (Scotland) Amendment Regulations 1996 S.I. 1996/2465
 Food Protection (Emergency Prohibitions) (Paralytic Shellfish Poisoning) Revocation Order 1996 S.I. 1996/2466
 Northbrook Instrument of Management (Variation) Order 1996 S.I. 1996/2467
 Local Government Act 1988 (Defined Activities) (Exemption) (The Common Council of the City of London) Order 1996 S.I. 1996/2469
 Fertilisers (Mammalian Meat and Bone Meal) (Amendment) Regulations 1996 S.I. 1996/2473
 Armed Forces Act 1996 (Commencement No. 1) Order 1996 S.I. 1996/2474
 Personal and Occupational Pension Schemes(Pensions Ombudsman) Regulations 1996 S.I. 1996/2475
 Social Security (Contracting-out and Qualifying Earnings Factor) Regulations 1996 S.I. 1996/2477
 Housing (Right to Buy) (Priority of Charges) Order 1996 S.I. 1996/2479
 Yarmouth (Isle of Wight) Harbour Revision Order 1996 S.I. 1996/2480
 HMSO Trading Fund (Revocation) Order 1996 S.I. 1996/2483
 Local Authorities' Traffic Orders (Procedure) (England and Wales) Regulations 1996 S.I. 1996/2489
 Land Registration (Scotland) Act 1979 (Commencement No. 10) Order 1996 S.I. 1996/2490

2501-2600
 Chemical Weapons (Notification) Regulations 1996 S.I. 1996/2503
 Marriage Ceremony (Prescribed Words) Act 1996 (Commencement) Order 1996 S.I. 1996/2506
 Act of Sederunt (Sheriff Court Bankruptcy Rules) 1996 S.I. 1996/2507
 United Kingdom Atomic Energy Authority (Extinguishment of Liabilities) Order 1996 S.I. 1996/2511
 Employment Rights Act 1996 (Residuary Commencement No. 1) Order 1996 S.I. 1996/2514
 Private International Law (Miscellaneous Provisions) Act 1995 (Commencement No. 2) Order 1996 S.I. 1996/2515
 County Courts (Interest on Judgment Debts) (Amendment) Order 1996 S.I. 1996/2516
 Occupational Pension Schemes (Modification of Schemes) Regulations 1996 S.I. 1996/2517
 Social Security (Non-Dependant Deductions) Regulations 1996 S.I. 1996/2518
 Social Security (Jobseeker's Allowance and Payments on Account) (Miscellaneous Amendments) Regulations 1996 S.I. 1996/2519
 Local Government Act 1988 (Defined Activities) (Exemption) (Lewisham London Borough Council) Order 1996 S.I. 1996/2520
 Fresh Meat (Beef Controls) (No. 2) (Amendment) Regulations 1996 S.I. 1996/2522
 Child Benefit (General) Amendment (No. 2) Regulations 1996 S.I. 1996/2530
 Local Authorities (Goods and Services) (Public Bodies) (The Julie Rose Stadium) Order 1996 S.I. 1996/2534
 Gas Safety (Rights of Entry) Regulations 1996 S.I. 1996/2535
 Finance Act 1996, section 8, (Appointed Day) Order 1996 S.I. 1996/2536
 Hydrocarbon Oil Duties (Marine Voyages Reliefs) Regulations 1996 S.I. 1996/2537
 Social Security and Child Support (Jobseeker's Allowance) (Miscellaneous Amendments) Regulations 1996 S.I. 1996/2538
 Local Authorities (Capital Finance) (Amendment No. 3) Regulations 1996 S.I. 1996/2539
 Civil Aviation (Canadian Navigation Services) (Amendment) Regulations 1996 S.I. 1996/2540
 Gas Safety (Installation and Use) (Amendment) (No. 2) Regulations 1996 S.I. 1996/2541
 Local Government Act 1988 (Defined Activities) (Exemption) (Braintree and South Bedfordshire District Councils) Order 1996 S.I. 1996/2542
 A406 Trunk Road (Enfield) Red Route Traffic Order 1996 S.I. 1996/2543
 Social Fund Cold Weather Payments (General) Amendment Regulations 1996 S.I. 1996/2544
 Income-related Benefits and Jobseeker's Allowance (Personal Allowances for Children and Young Persons) (Amendment) Regulations 1996 S.I. 1996/2545
 National Park Authorities (England) (Amendment) Order 1996 S.I. 1996/2546
 Local Government Changes (Rent Act Registration Areas) Order 1996 S.I. 1996/2547
 Prosecutor's Right of Appeal in Summary Proceedings (Scotland) Order 1996 S.I. 1996/2548
 Parental Responsibilities and Parental Rights Agreement (Scotland) Regulations 1996 S.I. 1996/2549
 Legal Aid in Contempt of Court Proceedings (Scotland) Amendment Regulations 1996 S.I. 1996/2550
 Railtrack Group PLC (Target Investment Limit) Order 1996 S.I. 1996/2551
 British Waterways Board (Sheffield and Tinsley Canal) (Reclassification) Order 1996 S.I. 1996/2552
 Swindon and Marlborough National Health Service Trust (Transfer of Trust Property) Order 1996 S.I. 1996/2553
 Income Tax (Employments) (Amendment No. 5) Regulations 1996 S.I. 1996/2554
 Criminal Legal Aid (Scotland) Regulations 1996 S.I. 1996/2555
 National Health Service (Optical Charges and Payments) (Scotland) Amendment (No.3) Regulations 1996 S.I. 1996/2556
 Foreign Satellite Service Proscription Order 1996 S.I. 1996/2557
 Registration of Marriages (Amendment) Regulations 1996 S.I. 1996/2558
 A3 Trunk Road (Woolmer Road Junction Improvement Slip Road) Order 1996 S.I. 1996/2559
 Environment Act (Commencement No. 6 and Repeal Provisions) Order 1996 S.I. 1996/2560
 Beef (Marketing Payment) (Amendment) Regulations 1996 S.I. 1996/2561
 Potatoes Originating in the Netherlands Regulations 1996 S.I. 1996/2563
 Education (Recognised Awards) (Richmond College) (No. 2) Order 1996 S.I. 1996/2564
 Jobseeker's Allowance (Transitional Provisions) Regulations 1996 S.I. 1996/2567
 Social Security (Back to Work Bonus) (No.2)Regulations 1996 S.I. 1996/2570
 National Health Service (Optical Charges and Payments) Amendment (No. 3) Regulations 1996 S.I. 1996/2574
 Education (School Performance Information) (England) Regulations 1996 S.I. 1996/2577
 Civil Courts (Amendment No. 3) Order 1996 S.I. 1996/2579
 Education (School Information) (England) Regulations 1996 S.I. 1996/2585
 Act of Sederunt (Sheriff Court Ordinary Cause Rules Amendment) (Miscellaneous) (Amendment) 1996 S.I. 1996/2586
 Act of Sederunt (Rules of the Court of Session Amendment No.5) (Family Actions and Miscellaneous) 1996 S.I. 1996/2587
 Central Nottinghamshire Healthcare National Health Service Trust (Establishment) Amendment Order 1996 S.I. 1996/2588
 Criminal Justice Act 1988 (Application to Service Courts) (Evidence) Order 1996 S.I. 1996/2592
 Antarctic Act 1994 (Gibraltar) Order 1996 S.I. 1996/2593
 Education (Inspectors of Schools in England) Order 1996 S.I. 1996/2594
 Child Abduction and Custody (Parties to Conventions) (Amendment) (No. 2) Order 1996 S.I. 1996/2595
 European Convention on Extradition Order 1990 (Amendment) Order 1996 S.I. 1996/2596
 Housing Benefit (Payment to Third Parties) (Northern Ireland) Order 1996 S.I. 1996/2597
 Double Taxation Relief (Taxes on Income) (Mongolia) Order 1996 S.I. 1996/2598
 Double Taxation Relief (Taxes on Income) (Venezuela) Order 1996 S.I. 1996/2599
 European Convention on Cinematographic Co-production (Amendment) Order 1996 S.I. 1996/2600

2601-2700
 Parliamentary Commissioner (No. 2) Order 1996 S.I. 1996/2601
 Essex Ambulance Service National Health Service Trust (Establishment) Amendment Order 1996 S.I. 1996/2602
 Income Support (General) Amendment (No. 3) Regulations 1996 S.I. 1996/2614
 Free Zone (Southampton) Designation (Variation of Area) Order 1996 S.I. 1996/2615
 Income Tax (Interest Relief) (Housing Associations) (Amendment) Regulations 1996 S.I. 1996/2616
 Airport Byelaws (Designation) Order 1996 S.I. 1996/2617
 Specified Diseases (Notification) Order 1996 S.I. 1996/2628
 Marketing Development (Limitation) Scheme 1996 S.I. 1996/2629
 Child Support Act 1995 (Commencement No. 3) Order 1996 S.I. 1996/2630
 Income Tax (Employments) (Amendment No. 6) Regulations 1996 S.I. 1996/2631
 Merchant Shipping (Fees) (Amendment) Regulations 1996 S.I. 1996/2632
 Dangerous Substances and Preparations (Safety) (Consolidation) (Amendment) Regulations 1996 S.I. 1996/2635
 Measuring Equipment (Measures of Length) (Amendment) Regulations 1996 S.I. 1996/2636
 Pensions Act 1995 (Commencement No. 8) Order 1996 S.I. 1996/2637
 Personal and Occupational Pension Schemes (Pensions Ombudsman) (Procedure) Amendment Rules 1996 S.I. 1996/2638
 M4 Motorway (Maidenhead Windsor And Eton Flood Alleviation Scheme) (Temporary Diversion) Scheme 1996 S.I. 1996/2639
 River Stinchar Salmon Fishery District (Baits and Lures) Regulations 1996 S.I. 1996/2640
 River Forth Salmon Fishery District (Baits and Lures) Regulations 1996 S.I. 1996/2641
 Manufactured Overseas Dividends (French Indemnity Payments) (Amendment) Regulations 1996 S.I. 1996/2642
 Income Tax (Manufactured Overseas Dividends) (Amendment No. 2) Regulations 1996 S.I. 1996/2643
 Taxes (Interest Rate) (Amendment No. 3) Regulations 1996 S.I. 1996/2644
 Income and Corporation Taxes Act 1988, section 737A, (Appointed Day) Order 1996 S.I. 1996/2645
 Finance Act 1996, section 159,(Appointed Day) Order 1996 S.I. 1996/2646
 Hull and Holderness Community Health National Health Service Trust (Transfer of Trust Property) (No. 2)Order 1996 S.I. 1996/2647
 Safety of Sports Grounds (Designation) Order 1996 S.I. 1996/2648
 Food Protection (Emergency Prohibitions) (Oil and Chemical Pollution of Fish and Plants) (Partial Revocation No. 6) Order 1996 S.I. 1996/2649
 Road Traffic (Permitted Parking Areas and Special Parking Areas) (City of Oxford and Parish of North Hinksey) Order 1996 S.I. 1996/2650
 Housing (Right to Buy) (Prescribed Persons) (Amendment) Order 1996 S.I. 1996/2651
 Housing (Right to Buy) (Prescribed Forms) (Amendment) Regulations 1996 S.I. 1996/2652
 Sports Grounds and Sporting Events (Designation) (Scotland) Amendment Order 1996 S.I. 1996/2653
 Double Taxation Relief (Manufactured Overseas Dividends) (Amendment) Regulations 1996 S.I. 1996/2654
 Legal Aid in Criminal and Care Proceedings (Costs) (Amendment) (No. 2) Regulations 1996 S.I. 1996/2655
 Legal Aid in Criminal and Care Proceedings (General) (Amendment) (No. 5) Regulations 1996 S.I. 1996/2656
 Dairy Produce Quotas (Amendment) Regulations 1996 S.I. 1996/2657
 Housing Act 1996 (Commencement No. 4) Order 1996 S.I. 1996/2658
 Social Security (Adjudication) Amendment(No. 2) Regulations 1996 S.I. 1996/2659
 Duffield and Wirksworth Light Railway Order 1996 S.I. 1996/2660
 A6 Trunk Road (Rothwell and Desborough Bypass and Detrunking) Order 1996 S.I. 1996/2661
 Export of Goods (Control) (Amendment No. 2) Order 1996 S.I. 1996/2663
 Motorways Traffic (Scotland) Amendment Regulations 1996 S.I. 1996/2664
 Cycle Racing on Highways (Scotland) Amendment Regulations 1996 S.I. 1996/2665
 Antarctic Act 1994 (Commencement) Order 1996 S.I. 1996/2666
 A41 London—Birmingham Trunk Road (East of Aylesbury to West of Tring) Detrunking Order 1991 (Amendment) Order 1996 S.I. 1996/2667
 Chemical Weapons (Notification) (Amendment) Regulations 1996 S.I. 1996/2669
 Licensing (Amendment) (Scotland) Act 1996 Commencement Order 1996 S.I. 1996/2670
 Asylum (Designated Countries of Destination and Designated Safe Third Countries) Order 1996 S.I. 1996/2671
 Northwick Park and St. Mark's National Health Service Trust (Transfer of Trust Property) Order 1996 S.I. 1996/2672
 Endangered Species (Import and Export) Act 1976 (Amendment) Order 1996 S.I. 1996/2677
 Environmental Protection (Prescribed Processes and Substances Etc.) (Amendment) (Petrol Vapour Recovery) Regulations 1996 S.I. 1996/2678
 Endangered Species (Import and Export) Act 1976 (Amendment) Regulations 1996 S.I. 1996/2684
 Seal Fisheries (North Pacific) Act 1912 (Amendment) Regulations 1996 S.I. 1996/2685
 Import of Seal Skins Regulations 1996 S.I. 1996/2686
 A41 Trunk Road (Camden and Westminster) Red Route (Bus Lanes) (No. 2) Experimental Traffic Order 1996 S.I. 1996/2687
 A41 Trunk Road (Westminster) Red Route (No. 2) Experimental Traffic Order 1996 S.I. 1996/2688
 A501 Trunk Road (Marylebone Road, Westminster) Red Route (Prescribed Routes and Prohibited Turns) (No. 1) Traffic Order 1996 S.I. 1996/2689

2701-2800
 Children (Scotland) Act 1995 (Commencement No.2 and Transitional Provisions) (Amendment) Order 1996 S.I. 1996/2708
 Act of Sederunt (Proceedings in the Sheriff Court under the Debtors (Scotland) Act 1987) (Amendment) 1996 S.I. 1996/2709
 European Parliamentary Elections (Day of By-election) (Merseyside West Constituency) Order 1996 S.I. 1996/2710
 Travel Concession Schemes (Amendment) Regulations 1996 S.I. 1996/2711
 Greater Manchester (Light Rapid Transit System) (Eccles Extension) Order 1996 S.I. 1996/2714
 Local Government Act 1988 (Defined Activities) (Exemption) (Reigate and Banstead Borough Council) Order 1996 S.I. 1996/2715
 Electricity Act 1989 (Disclosure of Information) (Licence Holders) Order 1996 S.I. 1996/2716
 Dual-Use and Related Goods (Export Control) Regulations 1996 S.I. 1996/2721
 Leeds City Council (A64(M) Motorway Slip Road at Mabgate) Scheme 1995 Confirmation Instrument 1996 S.I. 1996/2724
 A2 Trunk Road (Bexley) Red Route Traffic Order 1996 S.I. 1996/2726
 A20 Trunk Road (Greenwich) Red Route Traffic Order 1996 S.I. 1996/2727
 A20 Trunk Road (Bexley and Bromley) Red Route Traffic Order 1996 S.I. 1996/2728
 Dorset Health Authority (Transfers of Trust Property) Order 1996 S.I. 1996/2731
 Eastbourne and County Healthcare National Health Service Trust (Transfer of Trust Property) Order 1996 S.I. 1996/2732
 United Leeds Teaching Hospitals National Health Service trust (Transfer of Trust Property) Order 1996 S.I. 1996/2733
 St. James's and Seacroft University Hospitals National Health Service Trust (Transfer of Trust Property) Order 1996 S.I. 1996/2734
 Social Security (Invalid Care Allowance) Amendment Regulations 1996 S.I. 1996/2744
 Social Security Benefit (Computation of Earnings) Regulations 1996 S.I. 1996/2745
 Local Government Act 1988 (Defined Activities) (Exemption) (Merton London Borough Council) Order 1996 S.I. 1996/2746
 Finance Act 1996, section 6, (Appointed Day) Order 1996 S.I. 1996/2751
 Wine and Made-wine (Amendment) Regulations 1996 S.I. 1996/2752
 Allocation of Housing Regulations 1996 S.I. 1996/2753
 Homelessness Regulations 1996 S.I. 1996/2754
 Peterhead Harbours Revision Order 1996 S.I. 1996/2755
 Stands for Carry-cots (Safety) (Revocation) Regulations 1996 S.I. 1996/2756
 Trade Descriptions (Place of Production) (Marking) (Revocation) Order 1996 S.I. 1996/2757
 Multiplex Licence (Broadcasting of Programmes in Gaelic) Order 1996 S.I. 1996/2758
 Broadcasting (Percentage of Television Multiplex Revenue) Order 1996 S.I. 1996/2759
 Independent Analogue Broadcasters (Reservation of Digital Capacity) Order 1996 S.I. 1996/2760
 Dogs (Fouling of Land) Regulations 1996 S.I. 1996/2762
 Dog Fouling (Fixed Penalties) Order 1996 S.I. 1996/2763
 International Carriage of Perishable Foodstuffs (Amendment) Regulations 1996 S.I. 1996/2765
 Isle of Wight Community Healthcare National Health Service Trust Dissolution Order 1996 S.I. 1996/2766
 St. Mary's Hospital National Health Service Trust Dissolution Order 1996 S.I. 1996/2767
 Isle of Wight Healthcare National Health Service Trust (Establishment) Order 1996 S.I. 1996/2768
 Act of Sederunt (Rules of the Court of Session Amendment No. 6) 1996 S.I. 1996/2769
 Teachers (Compensation for Redundancy and Premature Retirement) (Amendment) Regulations 1996 S.I. 1996/2777
 Health and Safety (Fees) Regulations 1996 S.I. 1996/2791
 A406 Trunk Road (Enfield) Red Route (Clearway) Traffic Order 1995 Variation Order 1996 S.I. 1996/2792
 Disability Discrimination (Questions and Replies) Order 1996 S.I. 1996/2793
 National Park Authorities (Levies) (England) Regulations 1996 S.I. 1996/2794
 Gas Act 1986 (Exemptions) (No. 4) Order 1996 S.I. 1996/2795
 Energy Conservation Act 1996 (Commencement No. 1) (Scotland) Order 1996 S.I. 1996/2796
 Home Energy Conservation Act 1995 (Commencement No. 3) (Scotland) Order 1996 S.I. 1996/2797
 Civil Aviation (Investigation of Air Accidents and Incidents) Regulations 1996 S.I. 1996/2798
 Vehicle Registration (Sale of Information) Regulations 1996 S.I. 1996/2800

2801-2900
 Industrial Tribunals (Interest on Awards in Discrimination Cases) Regulations 1996 S.I. 1996/2803
 Local Government, Teachers' and National Health Service (Scotland) Pension Schemes (Provision of Information and Administrative Expenses etc.) Regulations 1996 S.I. 1996/2809
 County Court (Amendment No. 2) Rules 1996 S.I. 1996/2810
 County Court (Forms) (Amendment) Rules 1996 S.I. 1996/2811
 Plastic Materials and Articles in Contact with Food (Amendment) (No. 2) Regulations 1996 S.I. 1996/2817
 Residuary Body for Wales (Penlan Road Offices Carmarthen) Order 1996 S.I. 1996/2819
 Joint Consultative Committees Order 1996 S.I. 1996/2820
 Merchant Shipping and Fishing Vessels (Medical Stores) (Amendment) Regulations 1996 S.I. 1996/2821
 Motor Vehicles (Driving Licences) Regulations 1996 S.I. 1996/2824
 Local Government Changes For England (Property Transfer and Transitional Payments) (Amendment) (No. 2) Regulations 1996 S.I. 1996/2825
 Local Government Changes for England (Capital Finance) (Amendment) Regulations 1996 S.I. 1996/2826
 Open-Ended Investment Companies (Investment Companies with Variable Capital) Regulations 1996 S.I. 1996/2827
 Approval of Codes of Management Practice (Residential Property) Order 1996 S.I. 1996/2839
 A13 Trunk Road (A117 Junction Improvement, Trunk Road and Slip Roads) Order 1996 S.I. 1996/2840
 A13 Trunk Road (Movers Lane Junction Improvement, Trunk Road And Slip Roads) Order 1996 S.I. 1996/2841
 Housing Grants, Construction and Regeneration Act 1996 (Commencement No. 2 and Revocation, Savings, Supplementary and Transitional Provisions) Order 1996 S.I. 1996/2842
 Home-Grown Cereals Authority Levy (Variation) Scheme (Approval) Order 1996 Approved by both Houses of Parliament S.I. 1996/2843
 M23 Motorway (Balcombe Road Interchange) Connecting Roads Scheme 1996 S.I. 1996/2854
 Act of Sederunt (Fees of Messengers-at-Arms) 1996 S.I. 1996/2855
 Act of Sederunt (Lands Valuation Appeal Court) 1996 S.I. 1996/2856
 Environment Act 1995 (Commencement No.7) (Scotland) Order 1996 S.I. 1996/2857
 Act of Sederunt (Fees of Sheriff Officers) 1996 S.I. 1996/2858
 Offshore Installations (Safety Zones) (No. 7) Order 1996 S.I. 1996/2859
 Royal Surrey County and St. LUke's Hospitals National Health Service Trust (Change of Name) Order 1996 S.I. 1996/2860
 Leeds Community and Mental Health Services Teaching National Health Service Trust (Transfer of Trust Property) Order 1996 S.I. 1996/2861
 Northumberland Health Authority (Transfers of Trust Property) Order 1996 S.I. 1996/2862
 Ayr Road Route (M77) (Speed Limit) Regulations 1996 S.I. 1996/2863
 East Yorkshire Community Healthcare National Health Service Trust (Transfer of Trust Property) Order 1996 S.I. 1996/2866
 Bodmin and Wenford Light Railway Order 1996 S.I. 1996/2867
 Child Abduction and Custody (Parties to Conventions) (Amendment) (No. 3) Order 1996 S.I. 1996/2874
 European Convention on Extradition(Dependent Territories) Order 1996 S.I. 1996/2875
 Intelligence Services Act 1994 (Dependent Territories) (Amendment) Order 1996 S.I. 1996/2876
 Criminal Justice Act 1988 (Designated Countries and Territories) (Amendment) (No. 2) Order 1996 S.I. 1996/2877
 Criminal Justice (International Co-operation) Act 1990 (Enforcement of Overseas Forfeiture Orders) (Amendment) Order 1996 S.I. 1996/2878
 Domestic Energy Efficiency Schemes (Northern Ireland) Order 1996 S.I. 1996/2879
 Drug Trafficking Act 1994 (Designated Countries and Territories) Order 1996 S.I. 1996/2880
 Maritime Security (Jersey) Order 1996 S.I. 1996/2881
 Naval, Military and Air Forces Etc. (Disablement and Death) Service Pensions Amendment (No. 3) Order 1996 S.I. 1996/2882
 Group Repair (Qualifying Buildings) Regulations 1996 S.I. 1996/2883
 Housing (Deferred Action and Charge for Enforcement Action) (Forms) Regulations 1996 S.I. 1996/2884
 Housing (Fitness Enforcement Procedures) Order 1996 S.I. 1996/2885
 Housing (Maximum Charge for Enforcement Action) Order 1996 S.I. 1996/2886
 Home Repair Assistance Regulations 1996 S.I. 1996/2887
 Disabled Facilities Grants and Home Repair Assistance (Maximum Amounts) Order 1996 S.I. 1996/2888
 Housing Renewal Grants (Services and Charges) Order 1996 S.I. 1996/2889
 Housing Renewal Grants Regulations 1996 S.I. 1996/2890
 Housing Renewal Grants (Prescribed Form and Particulars) Regulations 1996 S.I. 1996/2891
 Rules of the Supreme Court (Amendment) 1996 S.I. 1996/2892
 Judicial Pensions (Miscellaneous) (Amendment) Regulations 1996 S.I. 1996/2893
 Law Reform (Miscellaneous Provisions) (Scotland) Act 1990 (Commencement No. 13) Order 1996 S.I. 1996/2894
 Residuary Body for Wales (Levies) Regulations 1996 S.I. 1996/2900

2901-3000
 Local Government Act 1988 (Defined Activities) (Exemption) (Harborough District Council) Order 1996 S.I. 1996/2902
 Income Support (General) (Standard Interest Rate Amendment) (No. 3) Regulations 1996 S.I. 1996/2903
 Education Act 1996 (Commencement No. 1) Order 1996 S.I. 1996/2904
 Conservation of Seals (England) Order 1996 S.I. 1996/2905
 Horserace Totalisator Board (Extension of Powers) Order 1996 S.I. 1996/2906
 Child Support Departure Direction and Consequential Amendments Regulations 1996 S.I. 1996/2907
 Merchant Shipping (Ship Inspection and Survey Organisations) Regulations 1996 S.I. 1996/2908
 Environment Act 1995 (Commencement No. 8 and Saving Provisions) Order 1996 S.I. 1996/2909
 A40 Trunk Road (Western Avenue, Hillingdon) (30 MPH Speed Limit) Order 1996 S.I. 1996/2910
 Utilities Contracts Regulations 1996 S.I. 1996/2911
 Leicestershire Fire Services (Combination Scheme) Order 1996 S.I. 1996/2912
 National Park Authorities (Levies) (Wales) (Amendment) Regulations 1996 S.I. 1996/2913
 Denbighshire and Wrexham (Areas) Order 1996 S.I. 1996/2914
 Bridgend and The Vale of Glamorgan (Areas) Order 1996 S.I. 1996/2915
 Wiltshire Fire Services (Combination Scheme) Order 1996 S.I. 1996/2916
 Staffordshire Fire Services (Combination Scheme) Order 1996 S.I. 1996/2917
 Bedfordshire Fire Services(Combination Scheme) Order 1996 S.I. 1996/2918
 Derbyshire Fire Services (Combination Scheme) Order 1996 S.I. 1996/2919
 Dorset Fire Services (Combination Scheme) Order 1996 S.I. 1996/2920
 Durham Fire Services(Combination Scheme) Order 1996 S.I. 1996/2921
 East Sussex Fire Services (Combination Scheme) Order 1996 S.I. 1996/2922
 Hampshire Fire Services(Combination Scheme) Order 1996 S.I. 1996/2923
 Buckinghamshire Fire Services(Combination Scheme) Order 1996 S.I. 1996/2924
 Cosmetic Products (Safety) Regulations 1996 S.I. 1996/2925
 Occupational Pensions (Revaluation) Order 1996 S.I. 1996/2926
 Local Government Act 1988 (Defined Activities) (Exemption of Ground Maintenance in Trunk Road Work Agreements) (Scotland) Order 1996 S.I. 1996/2934
 Local Government, Planning and Land Act 1980 (Competition) (Scotland) Regulations 1996 S.I. 1996/2935
 Local Government, Planning and Land Act 1980 (Competition) (Scotland) Amendment Regulations 1996 S.I. 1996/2936
 A41 Trunk Road (Watford Way/Hendon Way, Barnet) Temporary Prohibition of Traffic Order 1996 S.I. 1996/2942
 Professions Supplementary to Medicine (Registration Rules) (Amendment) Order of Council 1996 S.I. 1996/2945
 Petroleum (Production) (Seaward Areas)(Amendment) Regulations 1996 S.I. 1996/2946
 Value Added Tax (Increase of Consideration for Fuel) Order 1996 S.I. 1996/2948
 Value Added Tax (Pharmaceutical Chemists) Order 1996 S.I. 1996/2949
 Value Added Tax (Increase of Registration Limits) Order 1996 S.I. 1996/2950
 Retirement Benefits Schemes (Indexation of Earnings Cap) Order 1996 S.I. 1996/2951
 Income Tax (Indexation) Order 1996 S.I. 1996/2952
 Income Tax (Furnished Accommodation) (Basic Amount) Order 1996 S.I. 1996/2953
 Income Tax (Cash Equivalents of Car Fuel Benefits) Order 1996 S.I. 1996/2954
 Insurance Premium Tax (Taxable Insurance Contracts) Order 1996 S.I. 1996/2955
 Inheritance Tax (Indexation) Order 1996 S.I. 1996/2956
 Capital Gains Tax (Annual Exempt Amount) Order 1996 S.I. 1996/2957
 Financial Services Act 1986 (Extension of Scope of Act) Order 1996 S.I. 1996/2958
 Housing Act 1996 (Commencement No. 5 and Transitional Provisions) Order 1996 S.I. 1996/2959
 Value Added Tax (Amendment) (No.5) Regulations 1996 S.I. 1996/2960
 Local Government Act 1988 (Defined Activities) (Exemption) (North Hertfordshire District Council and Hertsmere Borough Council) Order 1996 S.I. 1996/2961
 Local Government Act 1988 (Defined Activities) (Exemption) (Cleveland Police Authority) Order 1996 S.I. 1996/2965
 Law Reform (Miscellaneous Provisions) (Scotland) Act 1990 (Commencement No.13) (Amendment) Order 1996 S.I. 1996/2966
 Copyright and Related Rights Regulations 1996 S.I. 1996/2967
 Statistics of Trade (Customs and Excise) (Amendment) Regulations 1996 S.I. 1996/2968
 Income Tax (Employments)(Notional Payments) (Amendment) Regulations 1996 S.I. 1996/2969
 Asylum and Immigration Act 1996 (Commencement No. 3 and Transitional Provisions) Order 1996 S.I. 1996/2970
 Control of Pollution (Applications, Appeals and Registers) Regulations 1996 S.I. 1996/2971
 Patents (Fees) Rules 1996 S.I. 1996/2972
 Army Terms of Service (Amendment) Regulations 1996 S.I. 1996/2973
 Trusts of Land and Appointment of Trustees Act 1996 (Commencement) Order 1996 S.I. 1996/2974
 Land Registration Rules 1996 S.I. 1996/2975
 National Park Authorities (Levies) (England) (Amendment) Regulations 1996 S.I. 1996/2976
 A66 Trunk Road (Long Newton Grade Separated Junction Slip Roads) Order 1996 S.I. 1996/2977
 London Docklands Development Corporation (Alteration of Boundaries) (Surrey Docks) Order 1996 S.I. 1996/2986
 Disability Discrimination Code of Practice (Goods, Services, Facilities and Premises) Order 1996 S.I. 1996/2987
 Social Security (Claims and Payments) Amendment (No. 2) Regulations 1996 S.I. 1996/2988
 Building Societies (Designated Capital Resources) (Amendment) Order 1996 S.I. 1996/2989
 Insurance Companies (Reserves) (Tax) Regulations 1996 S.I. 1996/2991
 Value Added Tax (Place of Supply of Services) (Amendment) Order 1996 S.I. 1996/2992
 Deregulation (Bills of Exchange) Order 1996 S.I. 1996/2993
 Financial Services Act 1986 (Restriction of Scope of Act and Meaning of Collective Investment Scheme) Order 1996 S.I. 1996/2996
 A30 Trunk Road (Great South West Road, Hounslow) (Temporary Restriction of Traffic) Order 1996 S.I. 1996/2997
 Dental Auxiliaries (Amendment) Regulations 1996 S.I. 1996/2998
 Beef (Marketing Payment) (No. 2) Regulations 1996 S.I. 1996/2999
 Bovine Products (Despatch to other Member States) (Amendment) Regulations 1996 S.I. 1996/3000

3001-3100
 Surface Waters (Abstraction for Drinking Water) (Classification) Regulations 1996 S.I. 1996/3001
 A406 London North Circular Trunk Road Popes Lane (B4491) to Western Avenue (A40) Improvement Orders 1988 Revocation Order 1996 S.I. 1996/3002
 Disability Discrimination Act 1995 (Commencement No. 4) Order 1996 S.I. 1996/3003
 Friendly Societies (Insurance Business) (Amendment) Regulations 1996 S.I. 1996/3008
 Friendly Societies (Activities of a Subsidiary) Order 1996 S.I. 1996/3009
 Merchant Shipping (Dangerous or Noxious Liquid Substances in Bulk) Regulations 1996 S.I. 1996/3010
 Insurance (Lloyd's) Regulations 1996 S.I. 1996/3011
 Mid Essex Community and Mental Health National Health Service Trust (Establishment) Amendment Order 1996 S.I. 1996/3012
 Motor Vehicles (Approval) Regulations 1996 S.I. 1996/3013
 Motor Vehicles (Type Approval for Goods Vehicles) (Great Britain) (Amendment) (No. 2) Regulations 1996 S.I. 1996/3014
 Motor Vehicles (Type Approval) (Great Britain) (Amendment) (No. 2) Regulations 1996 S.I. 1996/3015
 Road Vehicles Lighting (Amendment) Regulations 1996 S.I. 1996/3016
 Road Vehicles (Construction And Use) (Amendment) (No. 6) Regulations 1996 S.I. 1996/3017
 Non-Domestic Rating Contributions (Wales) (Amendment) Regulations 1996 S.I. 1996/3018
 Health Authorities Act 1995 (Transitional Provisions) (Wales) Amendment Order 1996 S.I. 1996/3019
 Measuring Equipment (Measures of Length) (Amendment) (No. 2) Regulations 1996 S.I. 1996/3020
 General Optical Council (Registration and Enrolment (Amendment) Rules) Order of Council 1996 S.I. 1996/3021
 Health and Safety (Repeals and Revocations) Regulations 1996 S.I. 1996/3022
 Town and Country Planning (General Permitted Development) (Scotland) Amendment (No. 2) Order 1996 S.I. 1996/3023
 New Town (Cumbernauld) (Transfer of Property, Rights and Liabilities) (No.2) Order 1996 S.I. 1996/3024
 A41 Trunk Road (Leavesden Slip Road) Order 1996 S.I. 1996/3026
 Chemical Weapons (Licence Appeal Provisions) Order 1996 S.I. 1996/3030
 Social Security (Contributions) Amendment (No. 6) Regulations 1996 S.I. 1996/3031
 Civil Aviation (Joint Financing) (Second Amendment) Regulations 1996 S.I. 1996/3032
 Road Vehicles (Construction and Use) (Amendment) (No. 7) Regulations 1996 S.I. 1996/3033
 Medicines (Veterinary Drugs) (Pharmacy and Merchants' List) (Amendment) Order 1996 S.I. 1996/3034
 Habitats (Scotland) Amendment Regulations 1996 S.I. 1996/3035
 Heather Moorland (Livestock Extensification) (Scotland) Amendment Regulations 1996 S.I. 1996/3036
 Set-Aside Access (Scotland) Amendment and Revocation Regulations 1996 S.I. 1996/3037
 Road Traffic (Special Parking Area) (Royal Borough of Kingston upon Thames) Order 1996 S.I. 1996/3038
 Personal Protective Equipment (EC Directive) (Amendment) Regulations 1996 S.I. 1996/3039
 Bridlington Harbour Revision Order 1996 S.I. 1996/3040
 Criminal Appeal Act 1995 (Commencement No. 2) Order 1996 S.I. 1996/3041
 Statutory Sick Pay (General) Amendment Regulations 1996 S.I. 1996/3042
 Monmouth–Fishguard Trunk Road (A40) (Carmarthen Eastern Bypass) Order 1996 S.I. 1996/3043
 River Ythan Salmon Fishery District (Baits and Lures) Regulations 1996 S.I. 1996/3046
 Surface Waters (Abstraction for Drinking Water) (Classification) (Scotland) Regulations 1996 S.I. 1996/3047
 Vocational Training (Public Financial Assistance and Disentitlement to Tax Relief) (Amendment) Regulations 1996 S.I. 1996/3049
 A23 Trunk Road (Croydon) Red Route (Bus Lanes) Traffic Order 1996 S.I. 1996/3050
 A23 Trunk Road (Croydon) Red Route (Clearway) Traffic Order 1996 S.I. 1996/3051
 A316 Trunk Road (Richmond) (No. 1) Red Route Traffic Order 1996 S.I. 1996/3052
 Motorways Traffic (England and Wales) (Amendment) Regulations 1996 S.I. 1996/3053
 Medicines (Pharmacies) (Applications for Registration and Fees) Amendment Regulations 1996 S.I. 1996/3054
 Litter (Fixed Penalty) Order 1996 S.I. 1996/3055
 Environmental Protection Act 1990 (Commencement No. 18) Order 1996 S.I. 1996/3056
 Passenger Transport Executives (Capital Finance) (Amendment) Order 1996 S.I. 1996/3058
 Road Traffic (Special Parking Area) (London Borough of Redbridge) (Amendment) Order 1996 S.I. 1996/3059
 A23 Trunk Road (Croydon)Red Route (Prescribed Route) Traffic Order 1996 S.I. 1996/3060
 Code of Practice on Environmental Procedures for Flood Defence Operating Authorities (Environment Agency) Approval Order 1996 S.I. 1996/3061
 Code of Practice on Environmental Procedures for Flood Defence Operating Authorities (Internal Drainage Boards and Local Authorities) Approval Order 1996 S.I. 1996/3062
 Offensive Weapons Act 1996 (Commencement No. 2) Order 1996 S.I. 1996/3063
 Criminal Justice Act 1988 (Offensive Weapons) (Exemption) Order 1996 S.I. 1996/3064
 Water Supply and Sewerage Services (Customer Service Standards) (Amendment) Regulations 1996 S.I. 1996/3065
 Education (Grants for Education Support and Training) (England) (Amendment) Regulations 1996 S.I. 1996/3066
 Broadcasting (Channel 3 Transmission and Shared Distribution Costs) Order 1996 S.I. 1996/3067
 Youth Courts (Constitution) (Amendment No. 2)Rules 1996 S.I. 1996/3068
 Grants to the Churches Conservation Trust Order 1996 S.I. 1996/3069
 Non-Domestic Rating Contributions (Scotland) Regulations 1996 S.I. 1996/3070
 Local Government Reorganisation (Wales) (Consequential Amendments No. 3) Order 1996 S.I. 1996/3071
 Habitat (Species-rich Grassland) (Wales) (Amendment) Regulations 1996 S.I. 1996/3072
 Habitat (Water Fringe) (Wales) (Amendment) Regulations 1996 S.I. 1996/3073
 Habitat (Coastal Belt) (Wales) (Amendment) Regulations 1996 S.I. 1996/3074
 Habitat (Broadleaved Woodland) (Wales) (Amendment) Regulations 1996 S.I. 1996/3075
 Moorland (Livestock Extensification) (Wales) (Amendment No. 2) Regulations 1996 S.I. 1996/3076
 Environmentally Sensitive Areas (Wales) Designation Orders (Amendment) Regulations 1996 S.I. 1996/3077
 Grants for Pre-school Education (Social Security Information) (Scotland) Regulations 1996 S.I. 1996/3078
 Grants for Pre-school Education (Prescribed Children) (Scotland) Order 1996 S.I. 1996/3079
 Companies Act 1985 (Audit Exemption) (Amendment) Regulations 1996 S.I. 1996/3080
 Consumer Credit (Exempt Agreements) (Amendment) (No. 2) Order 1996 S.I. 1996/3081
 Environmentally Sensitive Areas (Scotland) Orders Amendment Regulations 1996 S.I. 1996/3082
 Organic Aid (Scotland) Amendment Regulations 1996 S.I. 1996/3083
 Legal Officers (Annual Fees) Order 1996 S.I. 1996/3084
 Ecclesiastical Judges and Legal Officers (Fees) Order 1996 S.I. 1996/3085
 Payments to the Churches Conservation Trust Order 1996 S.I. 1996/3086
 Community Bus (Amendment) Regulations 1996 S.I. 1996/3087
 Minibus and Other Section 19 Permit Buses (Amendment) Regulations 1996 S.I. 1996/3088
 Civil Aviation (Route Charges for Navigation Services) (Second Amendment) Regulations 1996 S.I. 1996/3089
 Animals (Scientific Procedures) Act 1986 (Fees) (No. 1) Order 1996 S.I. 1996/3090
 Animals (Scientific Procedures) Act 1986 (Fees) (No. 2) Order 1996 S.I. 1996/3091
 Local Authorities (Goods and Services) (Public Bodies)(Sports Councils) Order 1996 S.I. 1996/3092
 Channel 4 (Application of Excess Revenues) Order 1996 S.I. 1996/3093
 Friendly Societies (General Charge and Fees) (Amendment) Regulations 1996 S.I. 1996/3094
 National Lottery etc. Act 1993 (Amendment of Section 23) Order 1996 S.I. 1996/3095
 Contracting Out of Functions (Court Staff) (Amendment) Order 1996 S.I. 1996/3096
 Deregulation (Rag Flock and Other Filling Materials Act 1951) (Repeal) Order 1996 S.I. 1996/3097
 Attachment of Debts (Expenses) Order 1996 S.I. 1996/3098
 Education (School Inspection) (No. 2) (Amendment) (No. 2) Regulations 1996 S.I. 1996/3099
 Air Navigation (Dangerous Goods) (Amendment) Regulations 1996 S.I. 1996/3100

3101-3200
 Nurses, Midwives and Health Visitors Act 1979 (Amendment) Regulations 1996 S.I. 1996/3101
 European Nursing and Midwifery Qualifications Designation Order 1996 S.I. 1996/3102
 Nurses, Midwives and Health Visitors (Admission to the Register and Training) Amendment Rules Approval Order 1996 S.I. 1996/3103
 Environmentally Sensitive Areas (England) Designation Orders (Amendment) Regulations 1996 S.I. 1996/3104
 Nitrate Sensitive Areas (Amendment) Regulations 1996 S.I. 1996/3105
 Habitat (Water Fringe) (Amendment) (No. 2) Regulations 1996 S.I. 1996/3106
 Habitat (Former Set-Aside Land) (Amendment) (No. 2) Regulations 1996 S.I. 1996/3107
 Habitat (Salt-Marsh) (Amendment) (No. 2) Regulations 1996 S.I. 1996/3108
 Organic Farming (Aid) (Amendment) Regulations 1996 S.I. 1996/3109
 Moorland (Livestock Extensification) (Amendment) (No. 2) Regulations 1996 S.I. 1996/3110
 Countryside Access (Amendment) Regulations 1996 S.I. 1996/3111
 A13 Trunk Road (New Road, Havering) (Prohibition of U-Turns and Use of Gaps in Central Reserve) Order 1996 S.I. 1996/3112
 Retirement Benefits Schemes (Tax Relief on Contributions) (Disapplication of Earnings Cap) (Amendment) Regulations 1996 S.I. 1996/3113
 Retirement Benefits Schemes (Continuation of Rights of Members of Approved Schemes) (Amendment) Regulations 1996 S.I. 1996/3114
 Occupational Pension Schemes (Transitional Provisions) (Amendment) Regulations 1996 S.I. 1996/3115
 Nursery Education (Amendment) Regulations 1996 S.I. 1996/3117
 Local Government (Changes for the Registration Service in Bedfordshire, Buckinghamshire, Derbyshire, Dorset, Durham, East Sussex, Hampshire, Leicestershire, Staffordshire and Wiltshire) Order 1996 S.I. 1996/3118
 Housing Renewal Grants and Home Repair Assistance (Amendment) Regulations 1996 S.I. 1996/3119
 Patents (Supplementary Protection Certificate for Plant Protection Products) Regulations 1996 S.I. 1996/3120
 Industrial and Provident Societies (Forms and Procedure) Regulations 1996 S.I. 1996/3121
 Allocation of Housing and Homelessness (Review Procedures and Amendment) Regulations 1996 S.I. 1996/3122
 Countryside Stewardship (Amendment) (No. 2) Regulations 1996 S.I. 1996/3123
 Products of Animal Origin (Import and Export) Regulations 1996 S.I. 1996/3124
 Fresh Meat (Import Conditions) Regulations 1996 S.I. 1996/3125
 Occupational Pension Schemes(Winding Up) Regulations 1996 S.I. 1996/3126
 Occupational Pension Schemes (Investment) Regulations 1996 S.I. 1996/3127
 Occupational Pension Schemes (Deficiency on Winding Up etc.) Regulations 1996 S.I. 1996/3128
 Road Vehicles (Construction and Use) (Amendment) (No. 8) Regulations 1996 S.I. 1996/3133
 Berkshire College of Art and Design, Maidenhead (Dissolution) Order 1996 S.I. 1996/3136
 Disability Working Allowance and Family Credit (General) Amendment Regulations 1996 S.I. 1996/3137
 Control of Substances Hazardous to Health (Amendment) Regulations 1996 S.I. 1996/3138
 Offshore Installations (Safety Zones) (No. 8) Order 1996 S.I. 1996/3139
 Films (Exhibition Periods) Order 1996 S.I. 1996/3140
 High Court and County Courts Jurisdiction (Amendment) Order 1996 S.I. 1996/3141
 Arable Area Payments Regulations 1996 S.I. 1996/3142
 Council Tax (Discount Disregards) (Amendment) (No. 2) Order 1996 S.I. 1996/3143
 Act of Sederunt (Commissary Court Books) (Amendment) 1996 S.I. 1996/3144
 Arbitration Act 1996 (Commencement No.1) Order 1996 S.I. 1996/3146
 Employment Protection (Continuity of Employment) Regulations 1996 S.I. 1996/3147
 London Docklands Development Corporation (Alteration of Boundaries) (Limehouse and Wapping) Order 1996 S.I. 1996/3148
 Criminal Appeal Act 1995 (Commencement No. 3) Order 1996 S.I. 1996/3149
 Industrial Tribunals Act 1996 (Commencement) Order 1996 S.I. 1996/3150
 Advanced Television Services Regulations 1996 S.I. 1996/3151
 Registration of Births, Deaths and Marriages (Fees) Order 1996 S.I. 1996/3152
 United Nations Arms Embargoes (Somalia, Liberia and Rwanda) (Isle of Man) Order 1996 S.I. 1996/3153
 United Nations Arms Embargoes (Somalia, Liberia and Rwanda) (Channel Islands) Order 1996 S.I. 1996/3154
 European Communities (Designation) (No. 3) Order 1996 S.I. 1996/3155
 Child Abduction and Custody (Falkland Islands) Order 1996 S.I. 1996/3156
 European Police Office (Legal Capacities) Order 1996 S.I. 1996/3157
 Licensing (Northern Ireland) Order 1996 S.I. 1996/3158
 Registration of Clubs (Northern Ireland) Order 1996 S.I. 1996/3159
 Criminal Justice (Northern Ireland) Order 1996 S.I. 1996/3160
 Criminal Justice (Northern Ireland Consequential Amendments) Order 1996 S.I. 1996/3161
 Rates (Amendment) (Northern Ireland) Order 1996 S.I. 1996/3162
 Succession (Northern Ireland) Order 1996 S.I. 1996/3163
 Double Taxation Relief (Taxes on Income) (China) Order 1996 S.I. 1996/3164
 Double Taxation Relief (Taxes on Income) (Denmark) Order 1996 S.I. 1996/3165
 Double Taxation Relief (Taxes on Income)(Finland) Order 1996 S.I. 1996/3166
 Double Taxation Relief (Taxes on Income) (Latvia) Order 1996 S.I. 1996/3167
 Double Taxation Relief (Taxes on Income) (Republic of Korea) Order 1996 S.I. 1996/3168
 European Convention on Cinematographic Co-production (Amendment) (No. 2) Order 1996 S.I. 1996/3169
 Judicial Committee (Fees) Order 1996 S.I. 1996/3170
 Extraterritorial US Legislation (Sanctions against Cuba, Iran and Libya) (Protection of Trading Interests) Order 1996 S.I. 1996/3171
 Education (Chief Inspector of Schools in Wales) Order 1996 S.I. 1996/3172
 Hovercraft (General) (Amendment) Order 1996 S.I. 1996/3173
 Local Government Act 1988 (Defined Activities) (Exemptions) (Wales) (Amendment) Order 1996 S.I. 1996/3179
 Child Minding and Day Care (Registration and Inspection Fees) (Amendment) Regulations 1996 S.I. 1996/3180
 Home Energy Conservation Act 1995 (Commencement No. 4) (Wales) Order 1996 S.I. 1996/3181
 European Communities (Iron and Steel Employees Re-adaptation Benefits Scheme) (No. 2) (Amendment) Regulations 1996 S.I. 1996/3182
 Bovine Spongiform Encephalopathy (No. 2) Order 1996 S.I. 1996/3183
 Bovine Spongiform Encephalopathy Compensation Order 1996 S.I. 1996/3184
 Specified Bovine Material (No. 3) (Amendment) Order 1996 S.I. 1996/3185
 Selective Cull (Enforcement of Community Compensation Conditions) Regulations 1996 S.I. 1996/3186
 Taxes (Interest Rate) (Amendment No. 4) Regulations 1996 S.I. 1996/3187
 Merchant Shipping (High-Speed Craft) Regulations 1996 S.I. 1996/3188
 County Court Fees (Amendment) Order 1996 S.I. 1996/3189
 Family Proceedings Fees (Amendment) Order 1996 S.I. 1996/3190
 Supreme Court Fees (Amendment) Order 1996 S.I. 1996/3191
 Nursery Education and Grant-Maintained Schools Act 1996 (Commencement No. 2) Order 1996 S.I. 1996/3192
 Medicines (Products Other Than Veterinary Drugs) (Prescription Only) Amendment (No. 2) Order 1996 S.I. 1996/3193
 Town and Country Planning (Atomic Energy Establishments Special Development) (Revocation) Order 1996 S.I. 1996/3194
 Social Security (Child Maintenance Bonus) Regulations 1996 S.I. 1996/3195
 Child Support (Miscellaneous Amendments) (No. 2) Regulations 1996 S.I. 1996/3196
 Advanced Television Services (Amendment) Regulations 1996 S.I. 1996/3197
 Motor Vehicles (Driving Licences) (Amendment) Regulations 1996 S.I. 1996/3198
 Road Works (Permission under Section 109) (Scotland) Regulations 1996 S.I. 1996/3199
 Fireworks (Safety) Regulations 1996 S.I. 1996/3200

3201-3300
 Children (Scotland) Act 1995 (Commencement No.3) Order 1996 S.I. 1996/3201
 Act of Sederunt (Civil Legal Aid Rules) (Amendment No. 2) 1996 S.I. 1996/3202
 Gas Act 1995 (Repeal of Superseded Provisions of the Gas Act 1986) Order 1996 S.I. 1996/3203
 Homelessness (Suitability of Accommodation) Order 1996 S.I. 1996/3204
 Local Authorities (Contracting Out of Allocation of Housing and Homelessness Functions) Order 1996 S.I. 1996/3205
 Driving Licences (Designation of Relevant External Law) Order 1996 S.I. 1996/3206
 Social Security (Incapacity for Work and Miscellaneous Amendments) Regulations 1996 S.I. 1996/3207
 Amusements with Prizes (Variation of Monetary Limits) Order 1996 S.I. 1996/3208
 Combined Probation Areas (North Yorkshire) Order 1996 S.I. 1996/3209
 Education Act 1996 (Amendment) Order 1996 S.I. 1996/3210
 Unfair Arbitration Agreements (Specified Amount) Order 1996 S.I. 1996/3211
 Severn Bridges Tolls Order 1996 S.I. 1996/3212
 Naval Medical Compassionate Fund (Amendment) Order 1996 S.I. 1996/3213
 Non-Domestic Rating (Chargeable Amounts for Small Hereditaments) Regulations 1996 S.I. 1996/3214
 High Court and County Courts (Allocation of Arbitration Proceedings) Order 1996 S.I. 1996/3215
 Employment Appeal Tribunal (Amendment) Rules 1996 S.I. 1996/3216
 Civil Evidence Act 1995 (Commencement No. 1)Order 1996 S.I. 1996/3217
 County Court (Amendment No. 3) Rules 1996 S.I. 1996/3218
 Rules of the Supreme Court (Amendment) 1996 S.I. 1996/3219
 Charities (The Proby Trust Fund) Order 1996 S.I. 1996/3220
 Electricity (Scottish Nuclear Limited) (Target Investment Limit) Order 1996 S.I. 1996/3221
 Immigration (Restrictions on Employment) Order 1996 S.I. 1996/3225
 Motor Vehicle Tyres (Safety) (Amendment) Regulations 1996 S.I. 1996/3227
 Civil Aviation Authority (Hovercraft) (Revocation) Regulations 1996 S.I. 1996/3231
 Police (Scotland) Amendment Regulations 1996 S.I. 1996/3232
 Retirement Benefits Schemes (Continuation of Rights of Members of Approved Schemes) (Amendment No. 2) Regulations 1996 S.I. 1996/3233
 Occupational Pension Schemes (Transitional Provisions) (Amendment No. 2) Regulations 1996 S.I. 1996/3234
 Sole (Specified Sea Areas) (Prohibition of Fishing)Order 1996 S.I. 1996/3235
 Haddock, Saithe, etc. (Specified Sea Areas) (Prohibition of Fishing) Order 1996 S.I. 1996/3236
 Public Lending Right Scheme 1982 (Commencement of Variations) (No. 2) Order 1996 S.I. 1996/3237
 Beef Special Premium Regulations 1996 S.I. 1996/3241
 Plant Health (Great Britain) (Amendment) (No. 3) Order 1996 S.I. 1996/3242
 Merchant Shipping (Fees) Regulations 1996 S.I. 1996/3243
 Non-Domestic Rating Contributions (England) (Amendment) (No. 2) Regulations 1996 S.I. 1996/3245
 A23 Trunk Road (Croydon) Red Route (Prescribed Route No. 2) Experimental Traffic Order 1996 S.I. 1996/3253
 A205 Trunk Road (Wandsworth and Richmond) Red Route Experimental Traffic Order 1996 S.I. 1996/3254
 Secure Accommodation (Scotland) Regulations 1996 S.I. 1996/3255
 Residential Establishments – Child Care (Scotland) Regulations 1996 S.I. 1996/3256
 Adoption Allowance (Scotland) Regulations 1996 S.I. 1996/3257
 Emergency Child Protection Measures (Scotland) Regulations 1996 S.I. 1996/3258
 Refuges for Children (Scotland) Regulations 1996 S.I. 1996/3259
 Children's Hearings (Transmission of Information etc.) (Scotland) Regulations 1996 S.I. 1996/3260
 Children's Hearings (Scotland) Rules 1996 S.I. 1996/3261
 Arrangements to Look After Children (Scotland) Regulations 1996 S.I. 1996/3262
 Fostering of Children (Scotland) Regulations 1996 S.I. 1996/3263
 Markets, Sales and Lairs (Amendment) Order 1996 S.I. 1996/3265
 Adoption Agencies (Scotland) Regulations 1996 S.I. 1996/3266
 Children (Reciprocal Enforcement of Prescribed Orders etc. (England and Wales and Northern Ireland)) (Scotland) Regulations 1996 S.I. 1996/3267
 Specified Bovine Material (No. 3) (Amendment) (No. 2) Order 1996 S.I. 1996/3268
 Medicines (Phenacetin Prohibition) (Revocation) Order 1996 S.I. 1996/3269
 Firearms (Amendment) Act 1988 (Firearms Consultative Committee) Order 1996 S.I. 1996/3272
 Amusements with Prizes (Variation of Monetary Limits) (Scotland) Order 1996 S.I. 1996/3273
 Housing Accommodation and Homelessness(Persons subject to Immigration Control) Order(Northern Ireland) 1996 S.I. 1996/3274
 Gas (Extent of Domestic Supply Licences) (Amendment) Order 1996 S.I. 1996/3275
 Animals (Scientific Procedures) Act 1986 (Appropriate Methods of Humane Killing) Order 1996 S.I. 1996/3278

External links
Legislation.gov.uk delivered by the UK National Archive
UK SI's on legislation.gov.uk
UK Draft SI's on legislation.gov.uk

See also
 List of Statutory Instruments of the United Kingdom

Lists of Statutory Instruments of the United Kingdom
Statutory Instruments